= Caslon =

Typeface with serifs

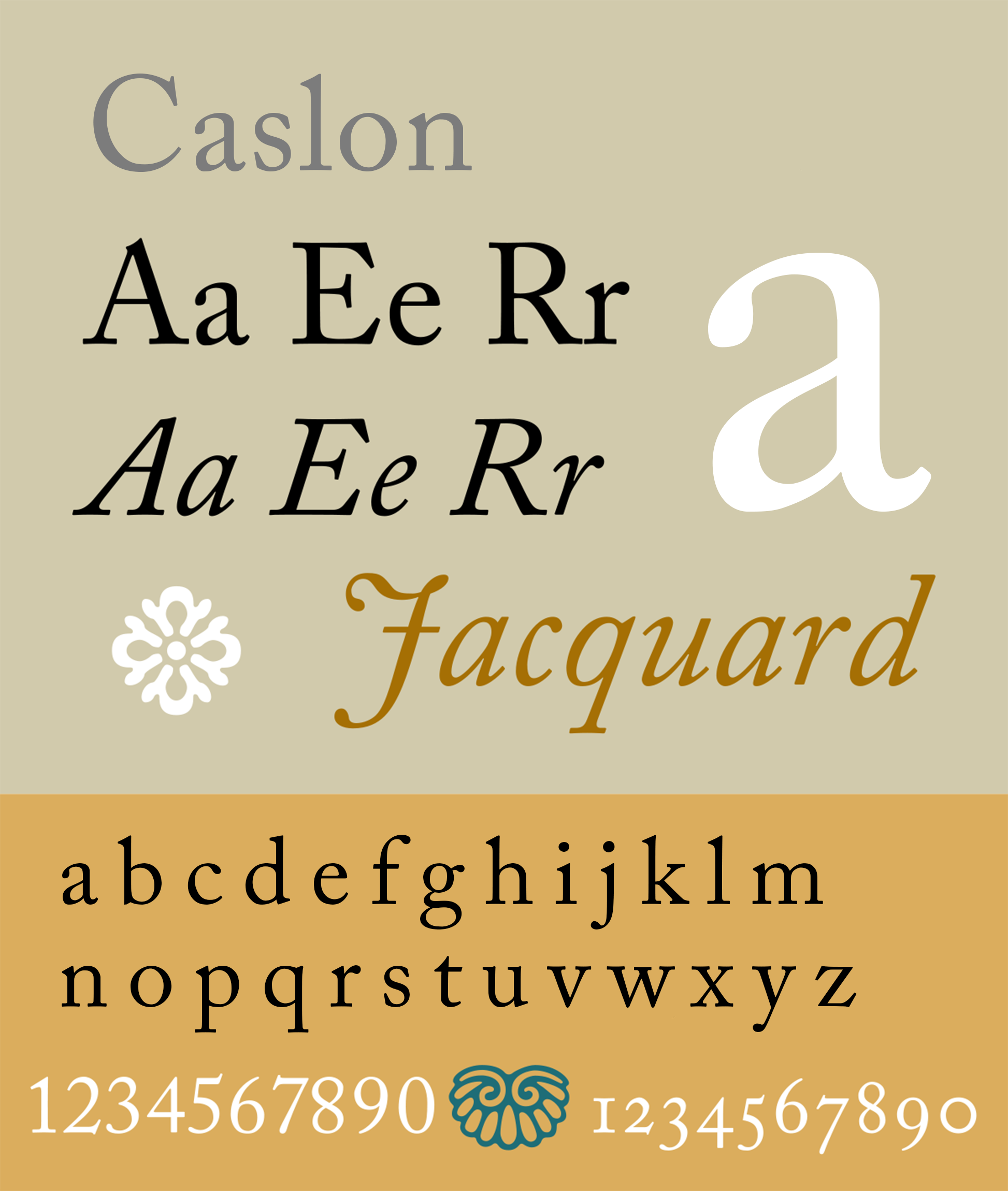
- Category: Serif
- Classification: Old-style; Dutch taste
- Designer: William Caslon I
- Foundry: Caslon Type Foundry
- Date released: 1725
- Re-issuing foundries: Mergenthaler Linotype; Lanston Monotype; Adobe; Bitstream; American Type Founders; ParaType; H. Berthold AG
- Variations: Many
- Shown here: Adobe Caslon by Carol Twombly

Caslon is the name given to serif typefaces designed by William Caslon I in London, or inspired by his work.

Caslon worked as an engraver of punches, the masters used to stamp the moulds or matrices used to cast metal type. He worked in the tradition of what is now called old-style serif letter design, that produced letters with a relatively organic structure resembling handwriting with a pen. Caslon established a tradition of engraving type in London, which previously had not been common, and was influenced by the imported Dutch Baroque typefaces that were popular in England at the time. His typefaces established a strong reputation for their quality and their attractive appearance, suitable for extended passages of text.

The letterforms of Caslon's roman, or upright type include an "A" with a concave hollow at top left and a "G" without a downwards-pointing spur at bottom right. The sides of the "M" are straight. The "W" has three terminals at the top and the "b" has a small tapered stroke ending at the bottom left. The "a" has a slight ball terminal. Ascenders and descenders are relatively short and the level of stroke contrast is modest in body text sizes. In italic, Caslon's "h" folds inwards and the "A" is sharply slanted. The "Q", "T", "v", "w" and "z" all have flourishes or swashes in the original design, something not all revivals follow. The italic "J" has a crossbar, and a rotated casting was used by Caslon in many sizes on his specimens to form the pound sign. However, Caslon created different designs of letters at different sizes: his larger sizes follow the lead of a type he sold cut in the previous century by Joseph Moxon, with more fine detail and sharper contrast in stroke weight, in the "Dutch taste" style. Caslon's larger-size roman fonts have two serifs on the "C", while his smaller-size versions have one half-arrow serif only at top right.

Caslon's typefaces were popular in his lifetime and beyond, and after a brief period of eclipse in the early nineteenth century, they returned to popularity, particularly for setting printed body text and books. Many revivals exist, with varying faithfulness to Caslon's original design. Modern Caslon revivals also often add features such as a matching boldface and "lining" numbers at the height of capital letters, neither of which were used in Caslon's time. (Note: Arabic numerals in Caslon's time were written as what are now called text figures, styled with variable height like lower-case letters.) William Berkson, designer of a revival of Caslon, describes Caslon in body text as "comfortable and inviting".

== History ==
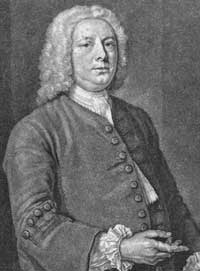
William Caslon in an engraved portrait by John Faber the younger

English roman, a Latin text face of the Caslon stable of typefaces. Restored extract from the specimen sheet below.

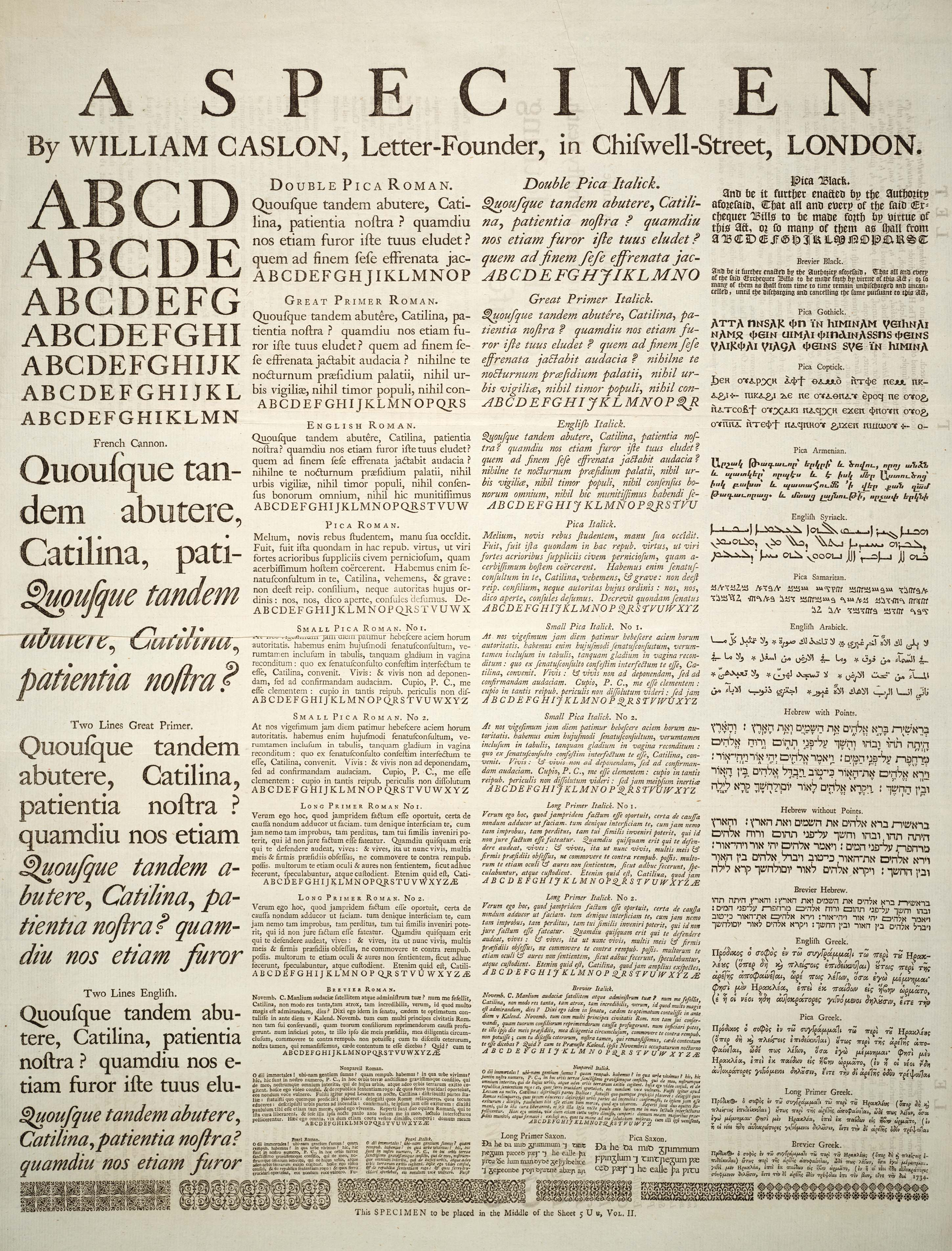
William Caslon's specimen sheet (dated 1734 but actually issued from 1738 onwards). Some of the types shown were not cut by Caslon, most notably the French Canon roman (probably cut by Joseph Moxon). (Note: Mosley identifies other non-Caslon types as the Samaritan and Syriac, and "it is difficult to believe that the lower case of the Small Pica no. 1...can be Caslon's work unless it is an early attempt. It was replaced in 1742, the only one of the roman types to be abandoned in this way." After the typesetting of this specimen Caslon cut an additional "Pica No. 2" and Pearl-size.)

Caslon began his career in London as an apprentice engraver of ornamental designs on firearms and other metalwork. According to printer and historian John Nichols, the main source on Caslon's life, the accuracy of his work came to the attention of prominent London printers, who advanced him money to carve steel punches for printing, first for foreign languages and then, as his reputation developed, for the Latin alphabet. Punchcutting was a difficult technique and many of the techniques used were kept secret by punchcutters or passed on from father to son. Caslon would later follow this practice, according to Nichols teaching his son his methods privately while locked in a room where nobody could watch them. As British printers had little success or experience of making their own types, they were forced to use equipment bought from the Netherlands, or France, and Caslon's types are therefore clearly influenced by the popular Dutch typefaces of his period. James Mosley summarises his early work: "Caslon's pica ... was based very closely indeed on a pica roman and italic that appears on the specimen sheet of the widow of the Amsterdam printer Dirck Voskens, c.1695, and which Bowyer had used for some years. Caslon's pica replaces it in his printing from 1725…Caslon's Great Primer roman, first used in 1728, a type that was much admired in the twentieth century, is clearly related to the Text Romeyn of Voskens, a type of the early seventeenth century used by several London printers and now attributed to the punch-cutter Nicolas Briot of Gouda." Mosley also describes several other Caslon faces as "intelligent adaptations" of the Voskens Pica.

Caslon's type rapidly built up a reputation for workmanship, being described by Henry Newman in 1733 as "the work of that Artist who seems to aspire to outvying all the Workmen in his way in Europe, so that our Printers send no more to Holland for the Elzevir and other Letters which they formerly valued themselves much." (Note: "Elzevir" is a somewhat meaningless term meaning small types used by the Elzevir or Elsevier family of printers. Mosley concludes that in practice the term meant more "crisp, competent presswork" than the work of any specific engraver, since the Elseviers often used types cut centuries before in Paris.) Mosley describes Caslon's Long Primer No. 1 type as "type with generous proportions and it was normally cast with letter-spacing that was not too tight, characteristics that are needed in types on a small body. And yet it is so soundly made that words that are set in it keep their shape and are comfortably readable...It is a type that works best in the narrow measure of a two-column page or in quite modest octavos." Caslon sold a French Canon face he did not engrave that may to have been the work of Joseph Moxon with some modifications, and his larger-size faces follow this high-contrast model. He publicised his type through contributing a specimen sheet to Chambers' Cyclopedia, which has often been cut out by antiquarian book dealers and sold separately.

Compared to the more delicate, stylised and experimental "transitional" typefaces gaining ground in mainland Europe during Caslon's life, notably the romain du roi type of the previous century, the work of Pierre-Simon Fournier in Paris, Fleischmann in Amsterdam and the Baskerville type of John Baskerville in Birmingham that appeared towards the end of Caslon's career, Caslon's type was quite conservative. Johnson notes that his 1764 specimen "might have been produced a hundred years earlier". Stanley Morison described Caslon's type as "a happy archaism".

While not used extensively in Europe, Caslon types were distributed throughout the British Empire, including British North America, where they were used on the printing of the U.S. Declaration of Independence. After William Caslon I's death, the use of his types diminished, but had a revival between 1840 and 1880 as a part of the British Arts and Crafts movement.

Besides regular text fonts, Caslon cut blackletter or "Gothic" types, which were also printed on his specimen. These could be used for purposes such as title pages, emphasis and drop caps. Bold type did not exist in Caslon's time, although some of his larger-size fonts are quite bold.

One criticism of some Caslon-style typefaces has been a concern that the capitals are too thick in design and stand out too much, making for an uneven colour on the page. Printer and typeface designer Frederic Goudy was a critic: "the strong contrast between the over-black stems of the capitals and the light weight stems in the lower-case...makes a 'spotty' page". He cited dissatisfaction with the style as an incentive for becoming more involved in type design around 1911, when he created Kennerley Old Style as an alternative.

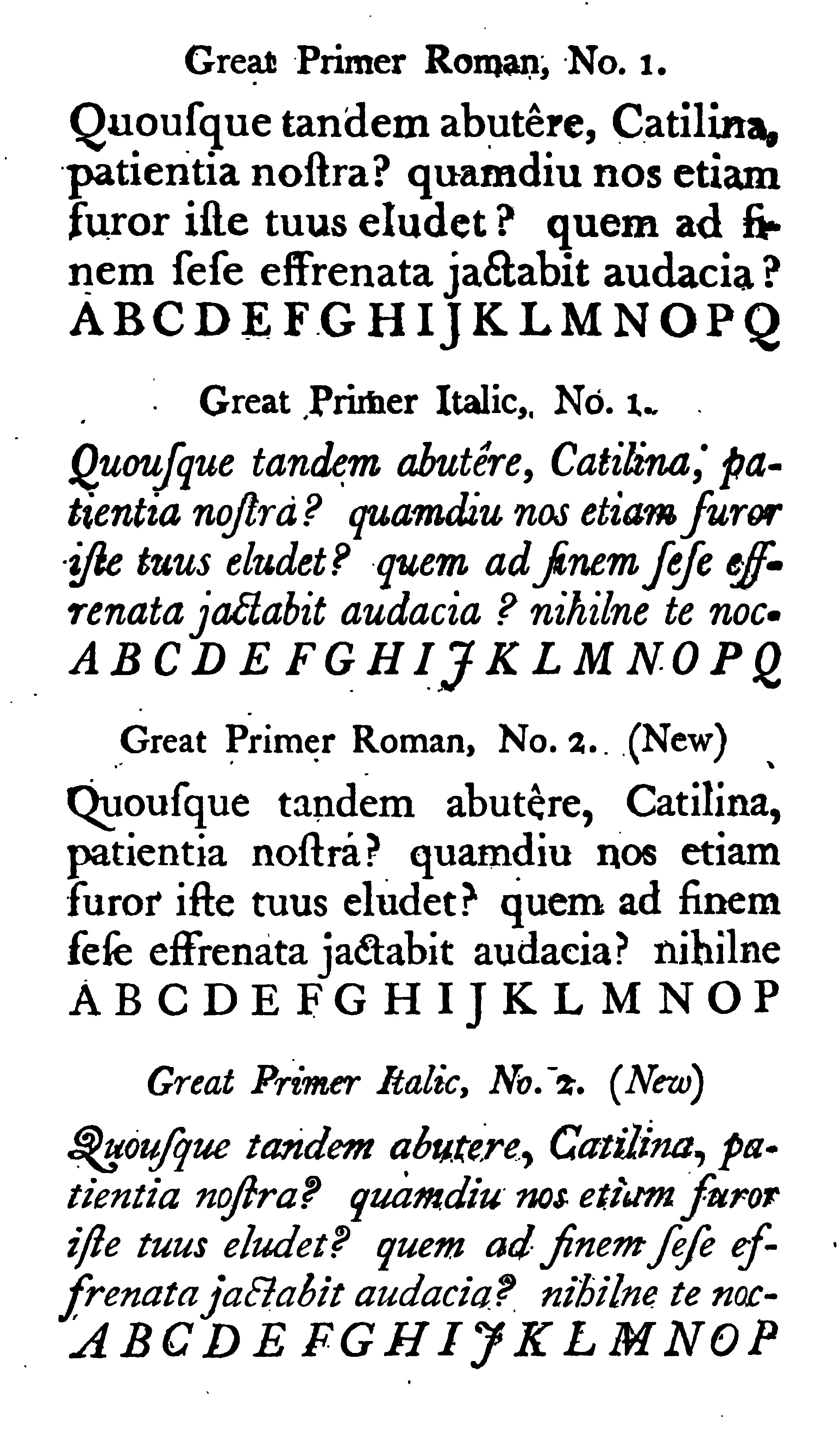
The Fry type foundry's imitations of first Baskerville (above) and then Caslon type (below), shown in a specimen attached to an edition of The Printer's Grammar, 1787. Mosley describes them as "a very close copy that is not easy to tell from the original."

== Eclipse ==
Caslon's types fell out of interest in the late eighteenth century, to some extent first due to the arrival of "transitional"-style typefaces like Baskerville and then more significantly with the growing popularity of "Didone" or modern designs in Britain, under the influence of the quality of printing achieved by printers such as Bodoni. (Note: Apparently sensing a business opportunity, the Fry Foundry set up in business offering copies of John Baskerville's types in the late eighteenth century, but (apparently finding this unsuccessful given preference for Caslon amongst conservative British printers) began also to issue copies of Caslon's types "with such accuracy as not to be distinguished from those of that celebrated Founder".) His Caslon foundry remained in business at Chiswell Street, London, but began to sell alternative and additional designs. His grandson, William Caslon III, broke away from the family to establish a competitor foundry at Salisbury Square, by buying up the company of the late Joseph Jackson. Justin Howes suggests that there may have been some attempt to update some of Caslon's types towards the newer style starting before 1816, noting that Caslon type cast by the 1840s included "a handful of sorts, Q, [an open-form italic] h, ſh, Q, T and Y, which would have been unfamiliar to Caslon, and which may have been cut at the end of the eighteenth century in a modest attempt to bring Old Face up to date. The h, ſh and T are to be seen [in a book from] 1816, large parts of which appear to have been printed from well-worn standing type."

Even as Caslon's type largely fell out of use, his reputation remained strong within the printing community. The printer and social reformer Thomas Curson Hansard wrote in 1825:

At the commencement of the 18th century the native talent of the founders was so little prized by the printers of the metropolis, that they were in the habit of importing founts from Holland, ...and the printers of the present day might still have been driven to the inconvenience of importation had not a genius, in the person of William Caslon, arisen to rescue his country from the disgrace of typographical inferiority.

Similarly, Edward Bull in 1842 called Caslon "the great chief and father of English type."

== Return to popularity ==
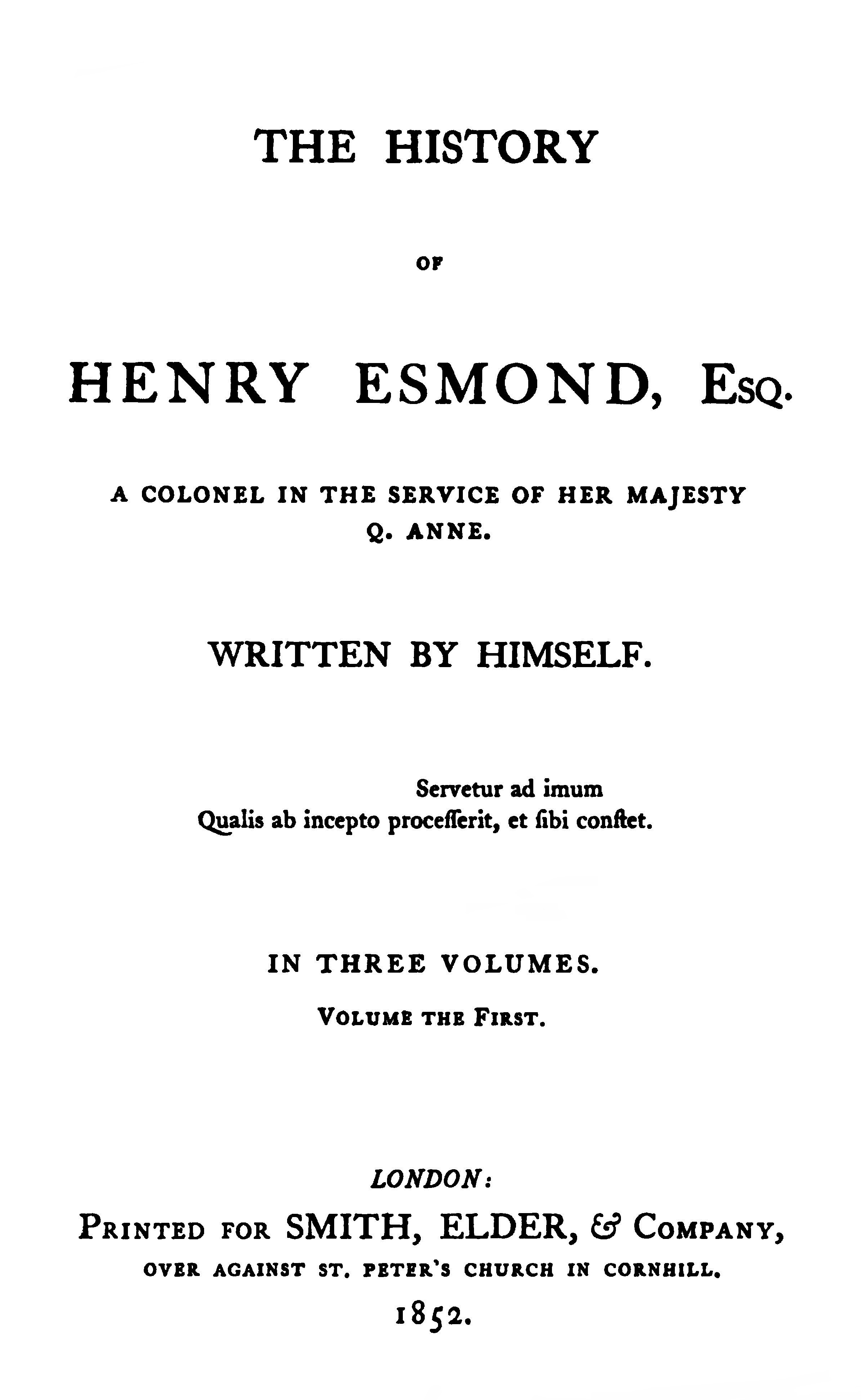
The History of Henry Esmond, a novel by Thackeray written as a fictional memoir. The first edition, of 1852, was printed in Caslon type, then just coming back into fashion. The goal was to achieve a period feel appropriate to its early eighteenth-century setting.

Interest in eighteenth-century printing returned in the nineteenth century with the rise of the Arts and Crafts movement, and Caslon's types returned to popularity in books and fine printing among companies such as the Chiswick Press, as well as display use in situations such as advertising.

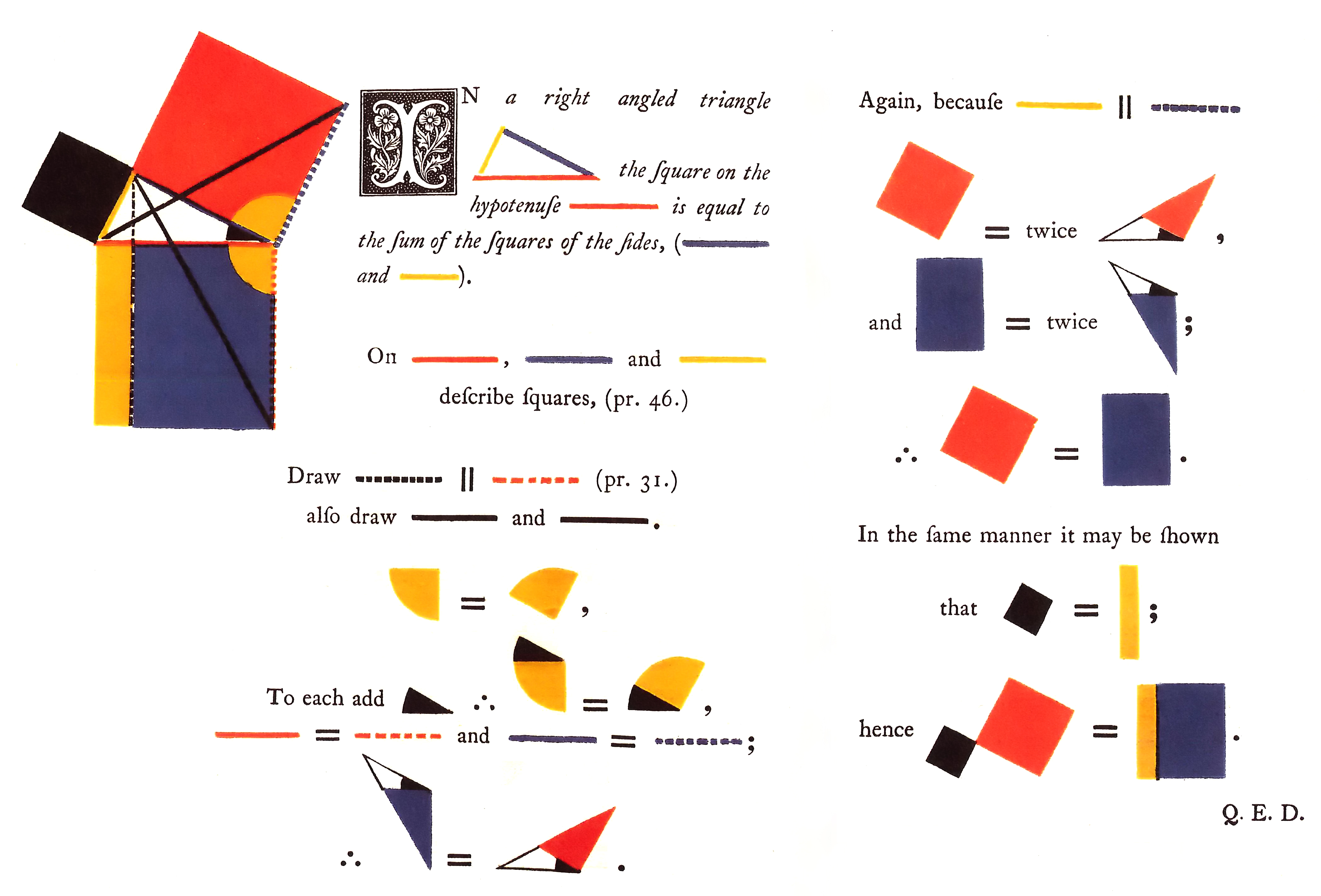
Caslon was often used for fine book printing in the nineteenth century in the United Kingdom, for example The First Six Books of the Elements of Euclid, published by William Pickering in 1847 and printed by the Chiswick Press. (Note: Note, however, some replacement sorts, including a Baskerville-style Q and open italic "h", both in the style of the late eighteenth century. Justin Howes suggests that these were attempts to modernise Caslon's type towards newer styles.)

Fine printing presses, notably the Chiswick Press, bought original Caslon type from the Caslon foundry; copies of these matrices were also made by electrotyping. From the 1860s new types began to appear in a style similar to Caslon's, starting from Miller & Richard's Modernised Old Style of c. 1860. (Bookman Old Style is a descendant of this typeface, but made bolder with a boosted x-height very unlike the original Caslon.) The Caslon foundry covertly replaced some sizes with new, cleaner versions that could be machine-cast and cut new swash capitals.

In the United States, "Caslon" became almost a genre, with numerous new designs unconnected to the original, with modifications such as shortened descenders to fit American common line, or lining figures, or bold and condensed designs, many foundries creating (or, in many cases, pirating) versions. By the 1920s, American Type Founders offered a large range of styles, some numbered rather than named. The hot metal typesetting companies Linotype, Monotype, Intertype and Ludlow, which sold machines that cast type under the control of a keyboard, brought out their own Caslon releases.

Many "Caslon" fonts are modernised, changing some characters to a modernised form. The Williams Caslon Text digitisation includes stylistic alternate characters allowing the user to choose whether to use Caslon's original characters, which have many flourishes in italic, or simplified "modernist" letterforms such as a J without crossbar and open-form italic h.

According to book designer Hugh Williamson, a second decline in Caslon's popularity in Britain did, however, set in during the twentieth century due to the arrival of revivals of other old-style and transitional designs from Monotype and Linotype. These included Bembo, Garamond, Plantin, Baskerville and Times New Roman.

Caslon type again entered a new technology with phototypesetting, mostly in the 1960s and 1970s, and then again with digital typesetting technology. There are many typefaces called "Caslon" as a result of that and the lack of an enforceable trademark on the name "Caslon", which reproduce the original designs in varying degrees of faithfulness.

Many of Caslon's original punches and matrices survived in the collection of the Caslon company (along with many replacement and additional characters), and are now part of the St Bride Library and Type Museum collections in Britain. Copies held by the Paris office of the Caslon company, the Fonderie Caslon, were transferred to the collection of the Musée de l'Imprimerie in Nantes. Scholarly research on Caslon's type has been carried out by historians including Alfred F. Johnson, Harry Carter, James Mosley and Justin Howes.

== Metal type versions ==
=== Caslon Old Face ===
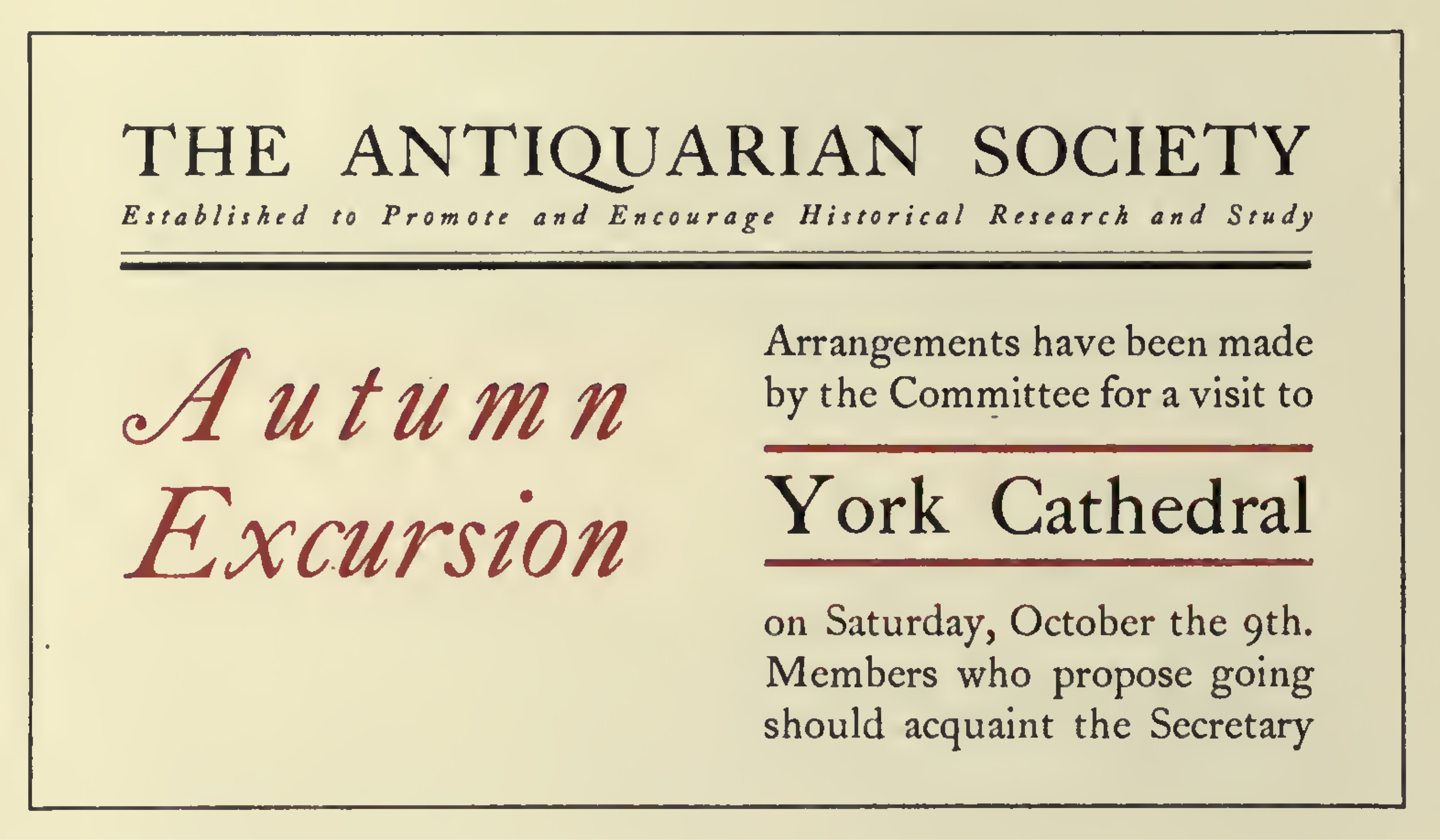
Caslon Old Face in a sample advertisement by the H.W. Caslon company, 1915

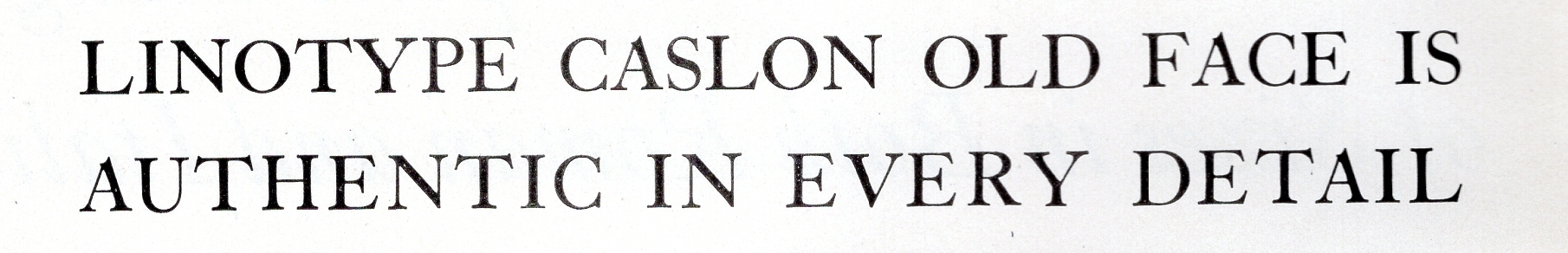
Linotype's Caslon Old Face hot metal typesetting adaptation. It was based on types provided by the H.W. Caslon company, although some of these were re-engraved around the end of the nineteenth century rather than being Caslon's original work.

The H.W. Caslon & Sons foundry reissued Caslon's original types as Caslon Old Face from the original (or, at least, early) matrices. The last lineal descendant of Caslon, Henry William Caslon, brought in Thomas White Smith as a new manager shortly before Caslon's death in 1874. Smith took over the company and instructed his sons to change their surnames to Caslon in order to provide an appearance of continuity. The foundry operated an ambitious promotional programme, issuing a periodical, "Caslon's Circular". It continued to issue specimens from top printers including George W. Jones until the 1920s.

Some Caslon faces were augmented by adding new features, in particular swash capitals for historicist printing. From around 1887 the type was sold with additional swash capitals. Howes describes these as "based rather closely on François Guyot's [popular 22pt] italic of around 1557...found in English printing until the early years of the eighteenth century." From around 1893 the company started to additionally recut some letters to make the type more regular and create matrices which could be cast by machine. Due to the cachet of the Caslon name, some of the recuttings and modifications of the original Caslon types were apparently not publicly admitted. The H.W. Caslon company also licensed to other printers matrices made by electrotyping, although some companies may also have made unauthorized copies.

In 1937, the H.W. Caslon & Sons foundry was also acquired by Stephenson Blake & Co, who thereafter added "the Caslon Letter Foundry" to their name.

The hot metal typesetting companies Monotype and Linotype offered "Caslon Old Face" releases that were based (or claimed to be based) on Caslon's original typefaces. Linotype's has been digitised and released by Bitstream.

=== Caslon 471 ===
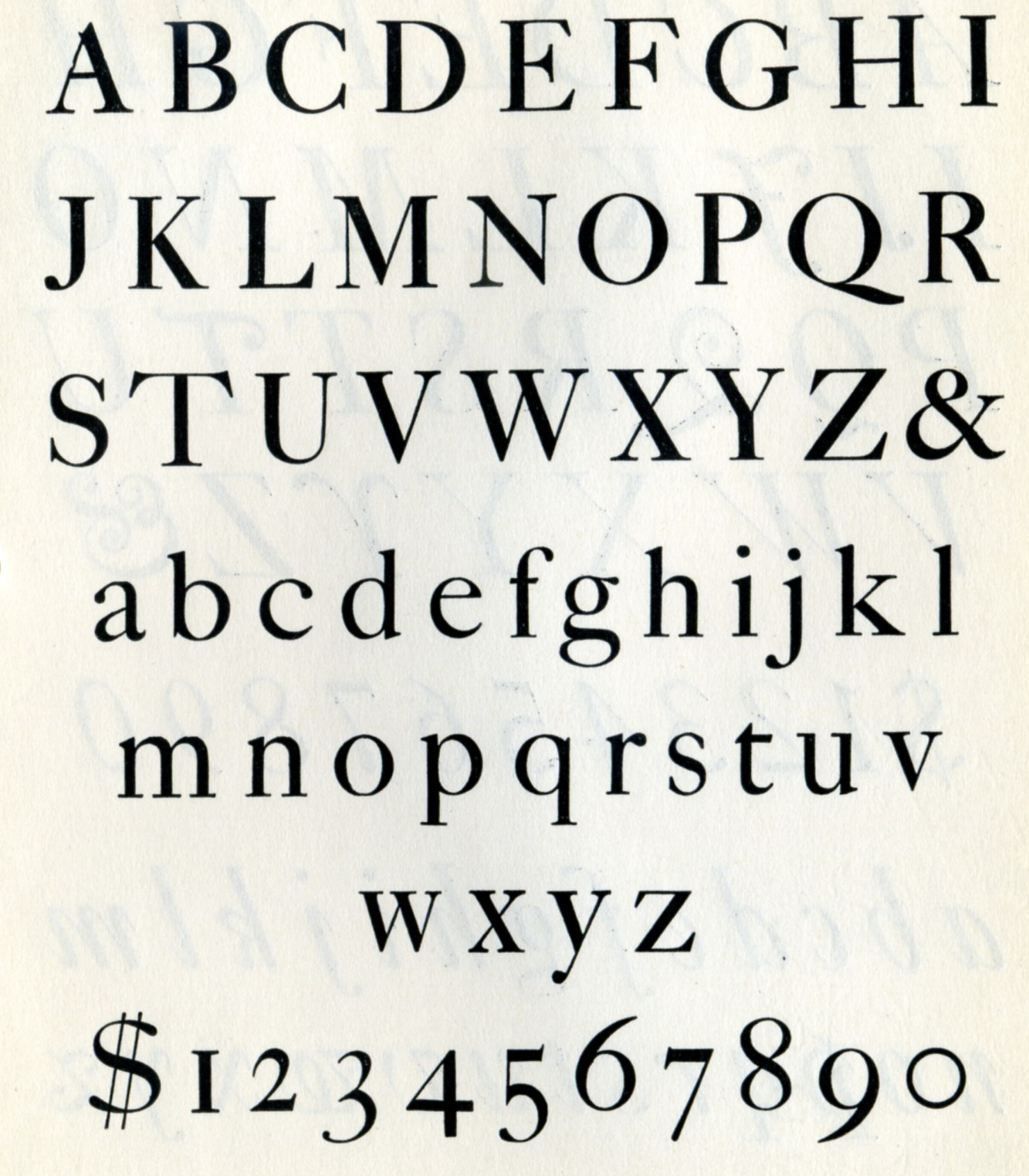
Caslon 471 on a metal type specimen sheet. Caslon's larger-size fonts had two serifs on the "C" rather than one.

Caslon 471 was the release of the "original" Caslon type sold by American Type Founders. American Type Founders advertised it as "the Caslon Oldstyle Romans and Italics precisely as Mr. Caslon left them in 1766. It was apparently cast from electrotypes held by American Type Founders' precursors. Thomas Maitland Cleland drew a set of additional swash capitals.

Caslon 471 is generally not available in digital forms as of 2022.

=== Caslon 540 ===
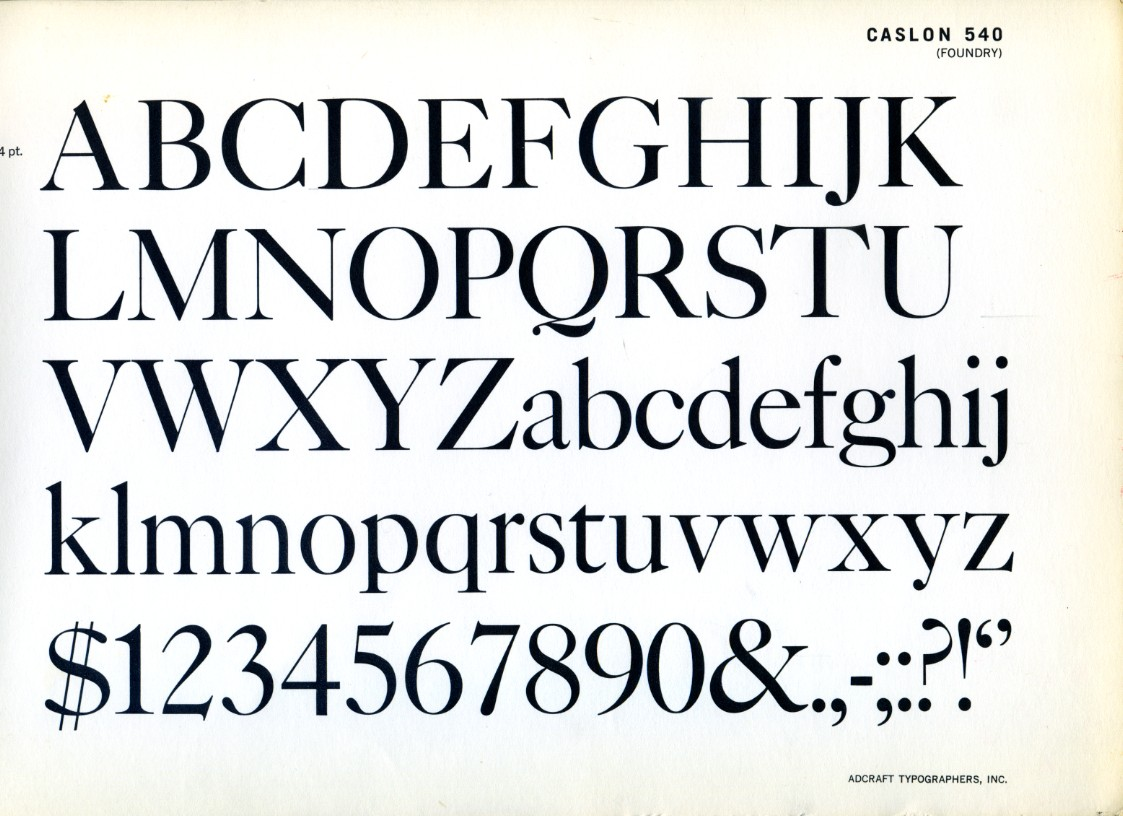
Caslon 540 from a metal type specimen sheet

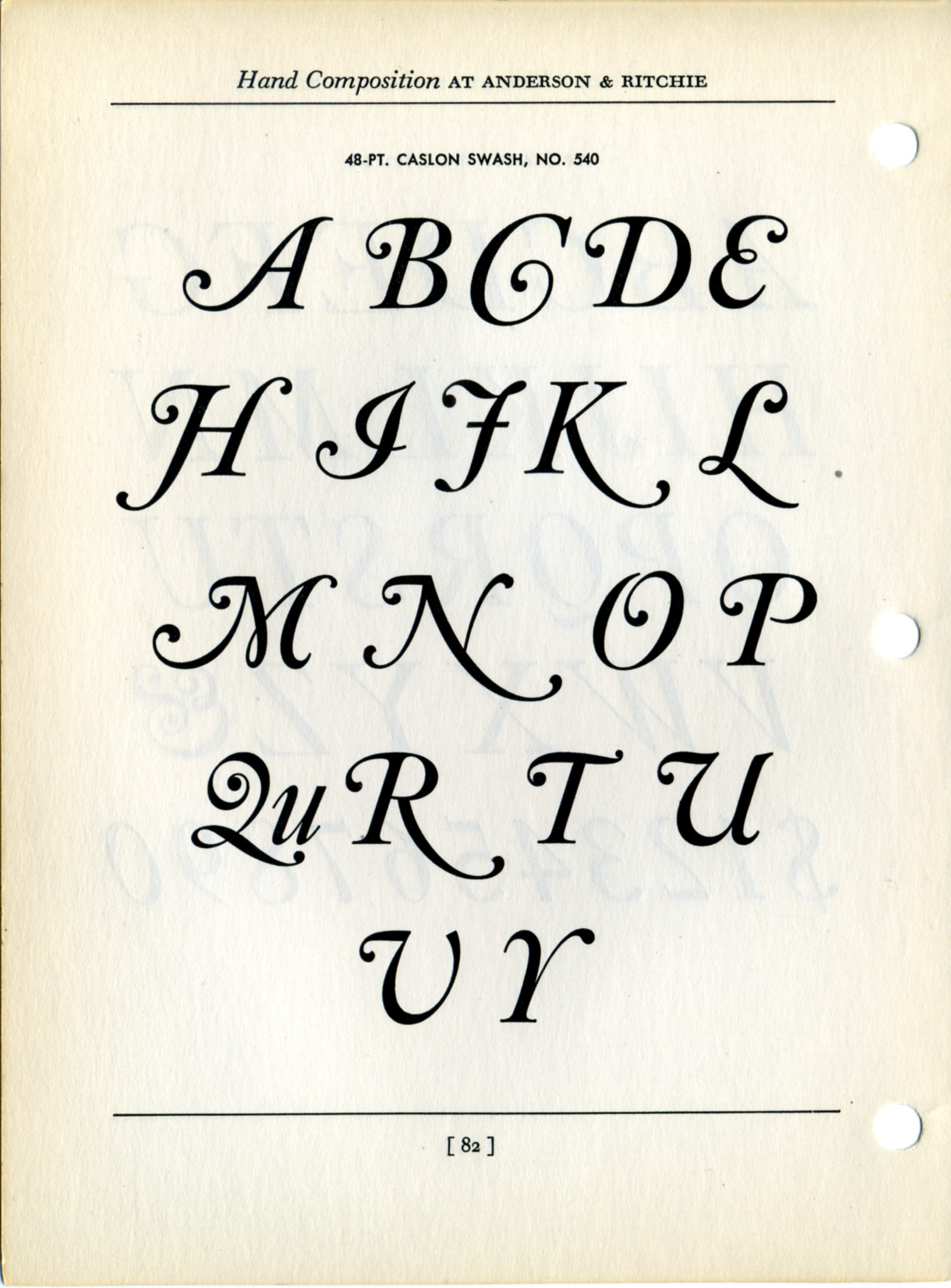
American Type Founders' additional swash capitals for Caslon 540. Note the difficulty of designing a swash "I" that does not resemble a "J".

Caslon 540 was a second American Type Founders version, with shortened descenders to allow tighter linespacing. The italic was distributed by Letraset with a matching set of swashes. As a result, revivals of this typeface are sometimes sold without a regular style (see below). The very distinctive ampersand in the italic is often used alone and mixed in with other typefaces in settings where no other characters from Caslon 540 are employed.

Digital revivals of Caslon 540 are sold by Bitstream, Linotype, and ParaType. The ParaType version includes Cyrillic characters. These revivals are sold with only the regular and italic styles and without any other weights. However, the same foundries also market Caslon Bold (i.e., Caslon 3) and its italic as separate products. Furthermore, Elsner+Flake, ITC, and URW sell the italic style without its upright style.

=== Caslon 3 ===
A slightly bolder version of Caslon 540, released by American Type Founders in 1905. Digital revivals of Caslon 3 (also called Caslon Bold) are sold by Bitstream, Linotype, and ParaType. The ParaType version has Cyrillic glyphs.

=== Caslon Openface ===
A decorative openface serif typeface with very high ascenders, popular in the United States. Despite the name, it has no connection to Caslon: it was an import of the French typeface "Le Moreau-le-Jeune", created by Fonderie Peignot in Paris as part of their Cochin family, by ATF branch Barnhart Brothers & Spindler. Digital revivals are sold by Bitstream and Monotype.

=== The Monotype Corporation (UK) ===
The British Monotype company produced three Caslon revivals.

1903, Series 20, Old Face Special
1906, Series 45, Old Face Standard
1915, Series 128 & 209, Caslon & Caslon Titling

=== Imprint ===
A more regular adaptation of Caslon by the British branch of Monotype was commissioned by the London publishers of The Imprint, a short-lived printing trade periodical that published during 1913. It had a higher x-height and was intended to offer an italic more complementary to the roman. It has remained popular since and has been digitised by Monotype.

=== Ludlow Typograph Company, Chicago, Illinois, USA ===
Ludlow had a wide variety of Caslon-types.

=== Caslon 641 ===
A heavy version of Caslon 540, released by American Type Founders in 1966.

=== Caslon 223 and 224 ===
Caslon 223 and 224 were phototypesetting families designed by Ed Benguiat of Lubalin, Smith, Carnase and then ITC. Like many ITC families, they have an aggressive, advertising-oriented bold structure, not closely related to Caslon's original work. 223 was the first version (named for LSC's street number), a companion version with more body text-oriented proportions followed sequentially numbered 224.

== Digital-only releases ==
The ligatures of Adobe Caslon Pro. Th is not historic.

=== Adobe Caslon (1990) ===
Adobe Caslon is a very popular revival designed by Carol Twombly. It is based on Caslon's own specimen pages printed between 1734 and 1770 and is a member of the Adobe Originals programme. It added many features now standard in high-quality digital fonts, such as small caps, old style figures, swash letters, ligatures, alternate letters, fractions, subscripts and superscripts, and matching ornaments.

Adobe Caslon is used for body text in The New Yorker and is one of the two official typefaces of the University of Virginia and the University of Southern California. It is also available with Adobe's Typekit programme, in some weights for free.

=== Big Caslon (1994) ===
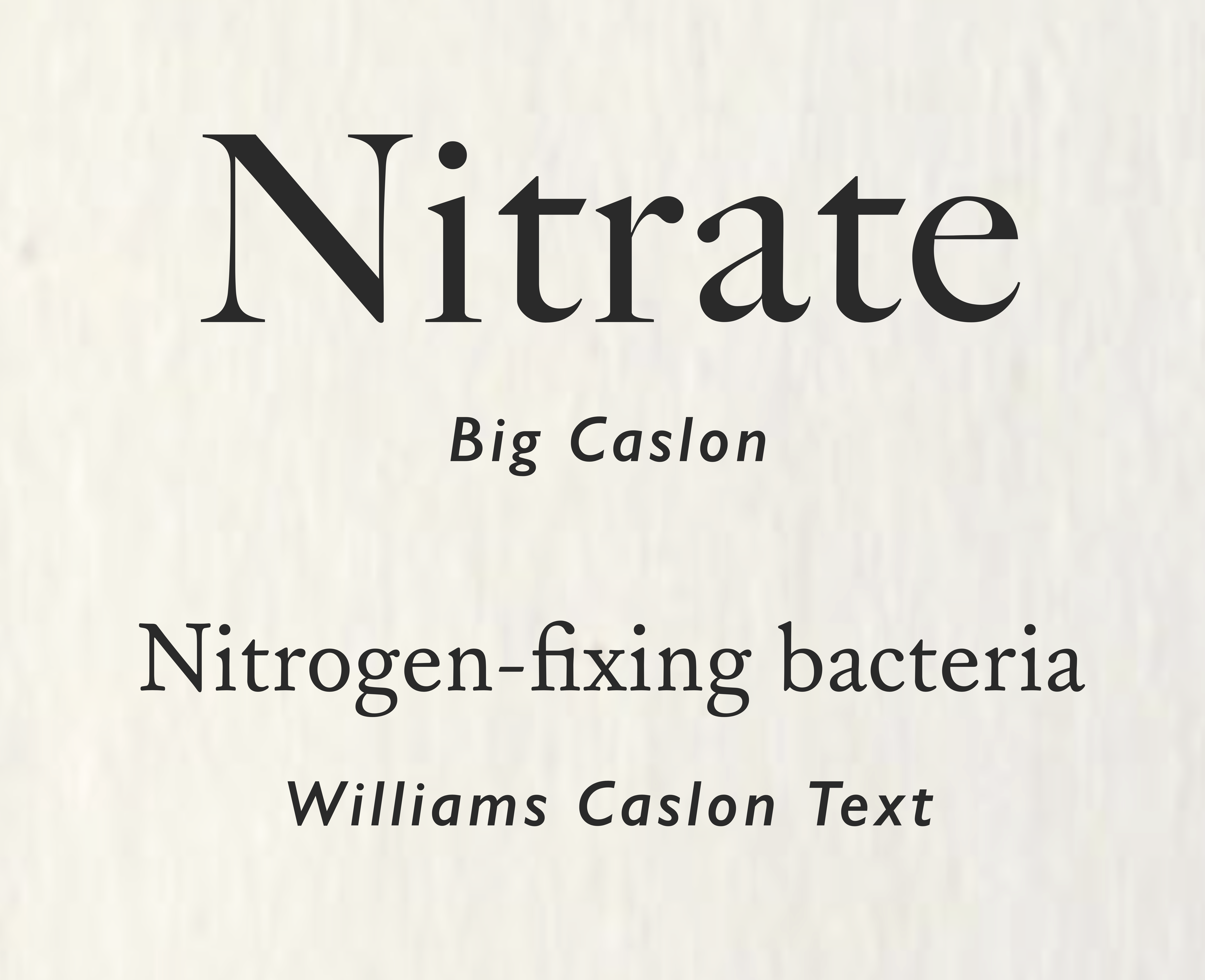
Two alternative revivals of Caslon, designed for large and small text sizes

Big Caslon by Matthew Carter is inspired by the "funkiness" of the three largest sizes of type from the Caslon foundry. These have a unique design with dramatic stroke contrast, complementary but very different from Caslon's text faces; one was apparently originally created by Joseph Moxon rather than Caslon. The typeface is intended for use at 18pt and above. The standard weight is bundled with Apple's macOS operating system in a release including small caps and alternates such as the long s. Initially published by his company Carter & Cone, in 2014 Carter revisited the design adding bold and black designs with matching italics, and republished it through Font Bureau. (Note: The modern family Quarto by Hoefler & Frere-Jones is a well-received revival of the Dutch display types that inspired Caslon’s larger sizes, and is therefore quite similar.) It is used by Boston magazine and the Harvard Crimson.

=== LTC Caslon (2005) ===
LTC Caslon is a digitisation of the Lanston Type Company's 14-point size Caslon 337 of 1915, in turn a revival of the original Caslon types. This family include fonts in regular and bold weights, with fractions, ligatures, small caps (regular and regular italic only), swashes (regular italic weight only), and Central European characters. A notable feature is that like some hot metal releases of Caslon, two separate options for descenders are provided for all styles: long descenders (creating a more elegant designs) or short (allowing tighter linespacing).

To celebrate its release, LTC included in early sales a CD of music by The William Caslon Experience, a downtempo electronic act, along with a limited edition upright italic design, "LTC Caslon Remix".

=== King's Caslon (2007) ===
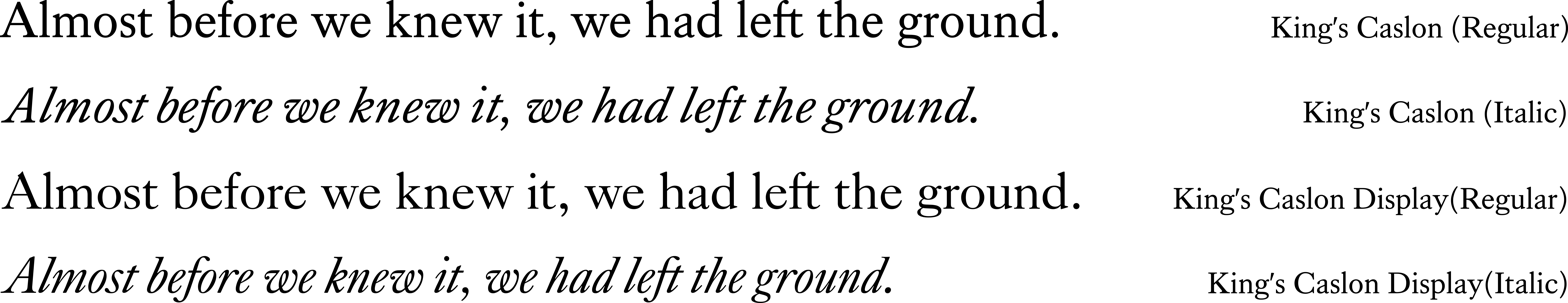
The text and display versions of King's Caslon, the former of which has a lower level of contrast and contemporary characteristics, while the latter has a more traditional design.

King's Caslon is a modern interpretation of Caslon created for King's College London and released by Dalton Maag. The typeface has a text version with two weights (Regular and Bold), in addition to a display version, each of which has its respective italic.

The text styles of King's Caslon have a lower level of contrast between strokes than most earlier Caslon revivals, while the display styles have more contrast.

=== Williams Caslon Text (2010) ===
A modern attempt to capture the spirit of Caslon by William Berkson, intended for use in body text. Although not aimed at being fully authentic in every respect, the typeface closely follows Caslon's original specimen sheet in many respects. The weight is heavier than many earlier revivals, to compensate for changes in printing processes, and the italic is less slanted (with variation in stroke angle) than on many other Caslon releases. Berkson described his design choices in an extensive article series.

Released by Font Bureau, it includes bold and bold italic designs, and a complete feature set across all weights, including bold small caps and swash italic alternates as well as optional shorter descenders and a "modernist" italic option to turn off swashes on lower-case letters and reduce the slant on the "A" for a more spare appearance. (Note: It is not to be confused with a totally different "Caslon FB" by Jill Pichotta, inspired by bold condensed Caslon-inspired typefaces used in American newspaper headlines.) It is currently used in Boston magazine and by Foreign Affairs.

A notable feature of Caslon's structure is its widely splayed "T", which can space awkwardly with an "h" afterwards. Accordingly, an emerging tradition among digital releases is to offer a "Th" ligature, inspired by the tradition of ligatures in calligraphy, though not a historical type ligature, to achieve tighter letterspacing. Adobe Caslon, LTC Caslon, Williams Caslon and Big Caslon (italics only, in the Font Bureau release) all offer a "Th" ligature as default or as an alternate. King's Caslon does not provide the "Th" ligature.

== Distressed revivals ==
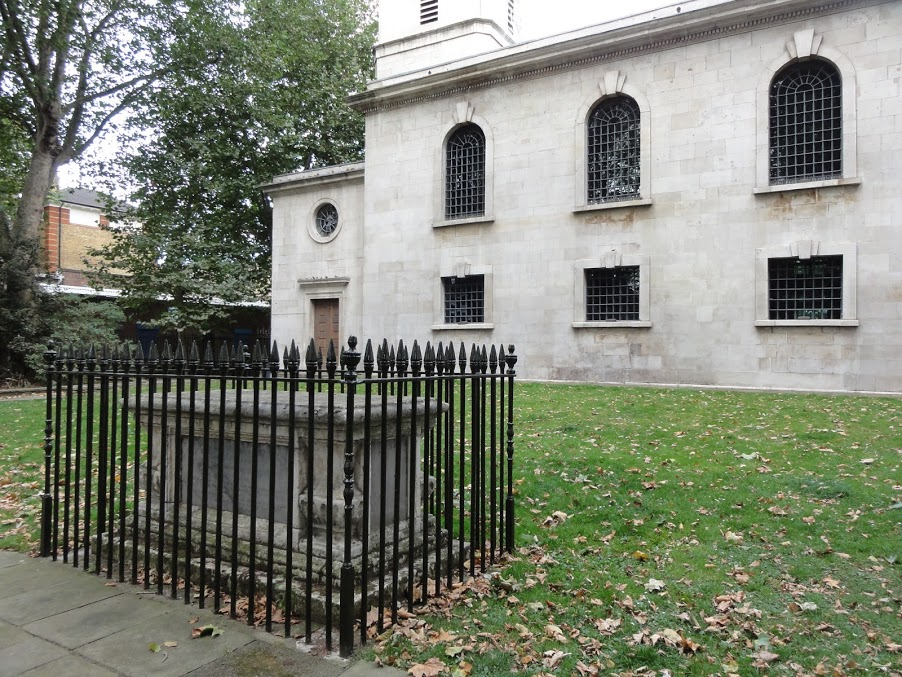
The Caslon family tomb at St Luke's church, London

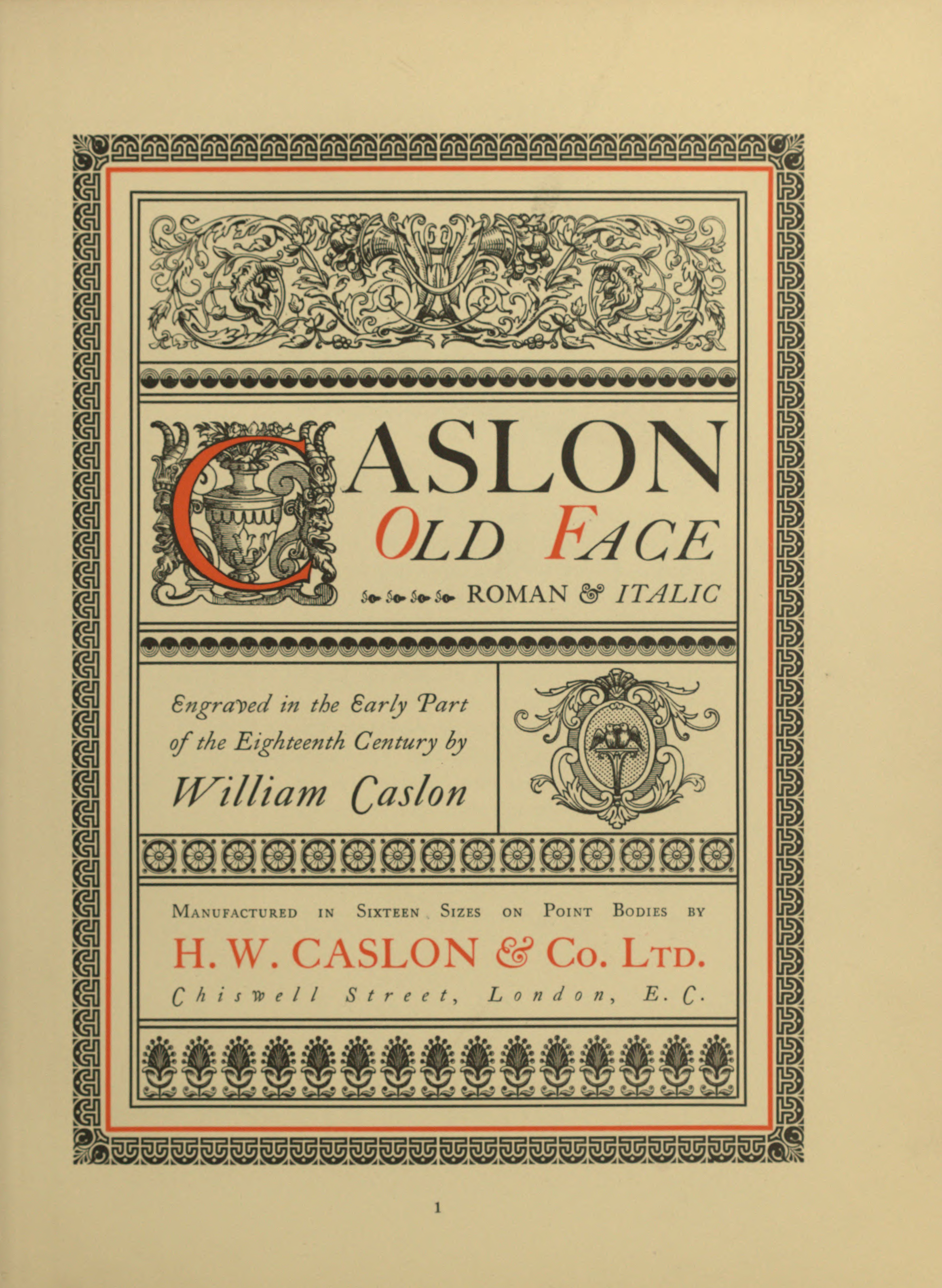
Caslon Old Face marketed in a 1915 specimen brochure with mock-18th century title page

A number of Caslon revivals are "distressed" in style, adding intentional irregularities to capture the worn, jagged feel of metal type.

=== ITC Founder's Caslon (1998) ===
ITC Founder's Caslon was digitized by Justin Howes. He used the resources of the St Bride Library in London to thoroughly research William Caslon and his types. Unlike previous digital revivals, this family closely follows the tradition of building separate typefaces intended for different sizes. Distressing varies by style, matching the effect of metal type, with large optical sizes offering the cleanest appearance.

This family was released by ITC in December 1998. Following the original Caslon types, it does not include bold typefaces, but uses old style figures for all numbers.

==== H. W. Caslon version ====
Following the release of ITC Founder's Caslon, Justin Howes revived the H.W. Caslon & Company name, and released an expanded version of the ITC typefaces under the Founders Caslon name.

Caslon Old Face is a typeface with multiple optical sizes, including 8, 10, 12, 14, 18, 22, 24, 30, 36, 42, 48, 60, 72, 96 points. Each font has small capitals, long esses and swash characters. The 96 point font came in roman only and without small capitals. Caslon Old Face was released in July 2001.

Caslon Ornaments is a typeface containing ornament glyphs.

These typefaces are packaged in the following formats:

- Founders Caslon Text: Caslon Old Face (8, 10, 12, 14, 18), Caslon Ornaments.
- Founders Caslon Display: Caslon Old Face (22, 24, 30, 36, 42, 48, 60, 72), Caslon Ornaments.
- Founders Caslon 1776: Caslon Old Face (14), Caslon Ornaments. A selection of the types used on the United States Declaration of Independence.

However, following the death of Justin Howes, the revived H.W. Caslon & Company went out of business. Howes bequeathed all rights to the H. W. Caslon version to St Bride Library in London.

=== NotCaslon (1995) ===
Designed by Mark Andresen for Emigre in 1995, this italic typeface is a parody of Caslon based on composite samples of dry transfer lettering, incorporating visual imperfections such as flakes and nicks.

=== Franklin Caslon (2006) ===
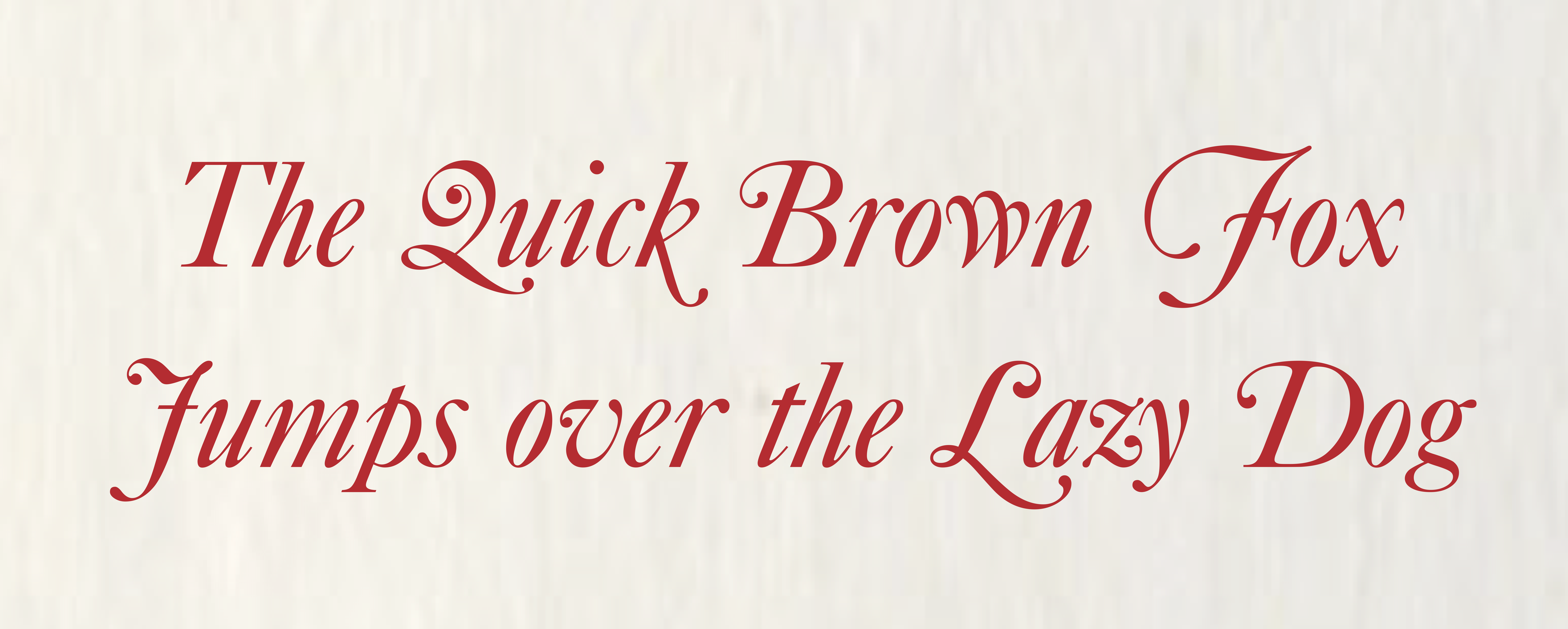
Caslon 540 in a digital version of the Letraset revival, showing some swashes and alternate characters

This 2006 creation by P22 is based on the pages produced by Benjamin Franklin circa 1750. It has a distressed appearance.

=== Caslon Antique ===
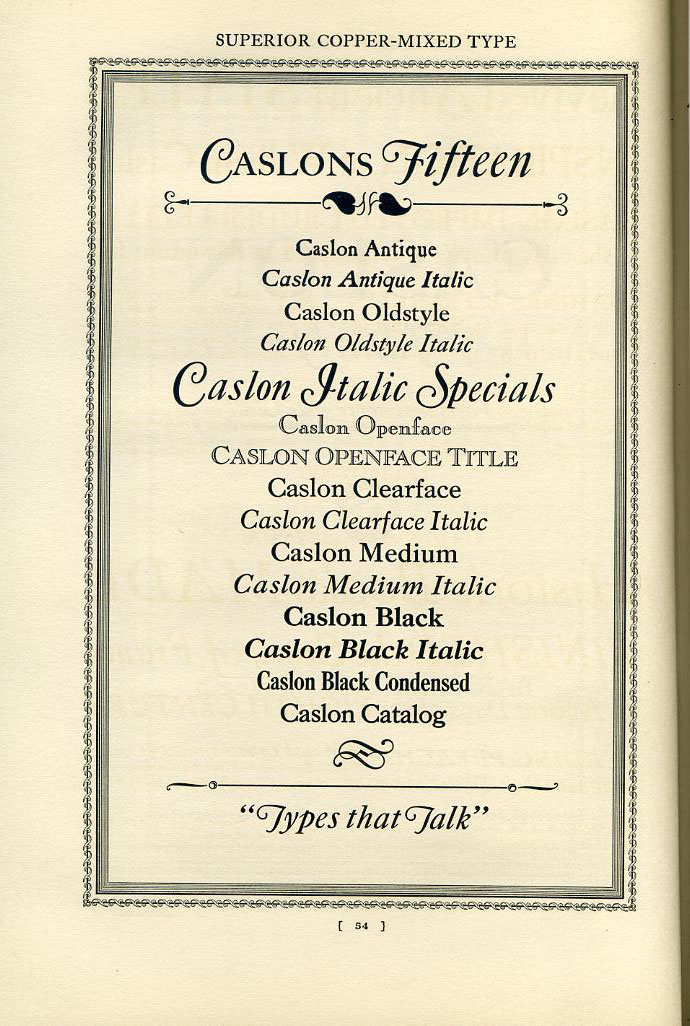
An American type foundry's family of "Caslon" types in the metal type period. Most have no connection to William Caslon's own work.

This decorative serif typeface was originally called Fifteenth Century, but later renamed Caslon Antique. It is not generally considered to be a member of the Caslon family of typefaces, because its design appears unrelated, and the Caslon name was only applied retroactively.
