= Arno (typeface) =

- Category: Serif
- Classification: Old-style
- Designer: Robert Slimbach
- Foundry: Adobe Type
- Date released: 2007

Arno, or Arno Pro, is a serif type family created by Robert Slimbach at Adobe intended for professional use. The name refers to the river that runs through Florence, a centre of the Italian Renaissance. Arno is an old-style serif font, drawing inspiration from a variety of 15th and 16th century typefaces. Slimbach has described the design as a combination of the period's Aldine and Venetian styles, with italics inspired by the calligraphy and printing of Ludovico degli Arrighi.

Arno was released in five optical sizes: separate fonts for different text sizes from captions to headings. In addition, Arno contains alternate letter styles such as swash italics inspired by Renaissance calligraphy. Other supported OpenType features include proportional and tabular numbers, old style figures, subscripts and superscripts, and ordinals.

Arno includes small caps, as well as dingbat and fleuron characters inspired by early printing. Arno supports the Cyrillic alphabet, mono- and polytonic Greek, as well as Latin diacritics, including the Unicode Latin Extended character set.

== Availability ==
Part of the Adobe Originals programme, Arno is included with Adobe Creative Suite 3, Adobe Font Folio 11 and Adobe Typekit.

== Inspiration ==
The font family is a multi-purpose type suitable for book design, inspired by the calligraphically-inspired humanistic types of the Italian Renaissance. Slimbach described his goal as giving it "a tangible style" to be "as readable as possible".

== Reception ==
Arno has received positive reviews. Reviewing the font for Typographica, designer Mark Simonson described it as "nicely sturdy" for body text and highlighted the sophistication of its italic alternate programming, noting that when enabled Arno "almost becomes a different typeface". Font expert Stephen Coles compared it to Requiem. Designer and calligrapher Paul Shaw suggested that its design represents a different, more "lively" approach to the neutral-looking Minion, and "yet not as loose and carefree as Brioso."

In 2011, the American Chemical Society began using Arno Pro for the body text of several of its journals, including the flagship Journal of the American Chemical Society after decades of using Times Roman.

== Optical sizes ==
Optical sizes	Caption	Small Text	Regular	Subhead	Display
Intended point sizes	<8.4	8.5–10.9	11–13.9	14–21.4	>21.5
Weights (all with italics)	Regular, semi-bold, bold	Regular, semi-bold, bold	Regular, semi-bold, bold	Regular, semi-bold, bold	Light, regular, semi-bold, bold

A light weight is included only in the display style. Slimbach commented that he felt that using light styles at text sizes would be a mistake because they would be hard to read.

== Awards ==
It was a winning entry in the Type Directors Club 2007 Type Design Competition (TDC^{2}), under the Type System / Superfamily category.

Document design expert Matthew Butterick used Arno in the print edition of his book Typography for Lawyers.
