= Poetica =

Poetica may refer to:

== Books ==
- Poetics (Aristotle)
- Poetica, a work by Girolamo Muzio

== Music ==
- Poetica (iiO album)
- Poetica (All Beauty Sleeps), a 2013 album by Sopor Æternus & the Ensemble of Shadows
- "Poetica", a song by Cesare Cremonini

== Typeface ==
- Poetica (typeface)
