= ATypI =

International typography organisation

The ATypI (/eɪˈtaɪpaɪ/) or Association Typographique Internationale (the International Typography Association) is an international non-profit organisation dedicated to typography and type design. The primary activity of the association is an annual conference, held in a different global city each year.

== History ==
ATypI was founded in 1957 by Charles Peignot (from the French type foundry Deberny & Peignot). The members of the organisation come from the typographic community from all over the world and consist primarily of type designers, representatives of type foundries, graphic designers and typographers.

The organisation is run by a board elected by ATypI members. Each board member is elected by the ATypI membership for a period of three years and may serve up to two consecutive terms. The current president, elected by the board in 2025, is Nada Abdallah. Currently there is no executive director; from 2015–25 it was Tamye Riggs. Previous presidents have been Charles Peignot, John Dreyfus, Tage Bolander, Martin Fehle, Ernst-Erich Marhencke, Mark Batty, Jean François Porchez, Gerry Leonidas, Jose Scaglione, John D. Berry, Carolina Laudon, Crystian Cruz, Thomas Phinney and Carima el-Behairy.

== Purposes ==
The objective and purpose of ATypI is to provide an integrated forum and conferences for all those involved in the field of fonts and typography through their profession and/or their interests, including without limitation:

- type designers and typographers;
- educators in graphic design, educational institutions;
- developers of typographic software and typesetting equipment of all sorts;
- printers and advertising agencies;
- professional organizations, associations; and
- all people, companies, associations, groups, or clubs interested in typography

ATypI also:

- preserves the culture, tradition and history of type and typography
- promotes contemporary digital fonts
- encourages outstanding typography and typographic design
- promotes a critical understanding of typographic issues

== Conference ==
The ATypI conference is held internationally, each year at a different city, usually in September or October. It is organised with the help of local members and institutions, often universities or colleges. In 2020, 2021 and 2022, due to the COVID-19 pandemic, ATypI conferences were held virtually.

Overview of ATypI conferences
| Year | City | Country |
|---|---|---|
| 1957 | Lausanne | Switzerland |
| 1958 | Düsseldorf | Germany |
| 1959 | Paris | France |
| 1960 | Paris | France |
| 1961 | Zandvoort | Netherlands |
| 1962 | Verona | Italy |
| 1963 | Vienna | Austria |
| 1964 | Cambridge | United Kingdom |
| 1965 | Zurich | Switzerland |
| 1966 | Mainz | Germany |
| 1967 | Paris | France |
| 1968 | Frankfurt | Germany |
| 1969 | Prague | Czech Republic |
| 1970 | Bruges | Belgium |
| 1971 | London | United Kingdom |
| 1972 | Barcelona | Spain |
| 1973 | Copenhagen | Denmark |
| 1974 | Paris | France |
| 1975 | Warsaw | Poland |
| 1976 | Hamburg | Germany |
| 1977 | Lausanne | Switzerland |
| 1978 | Munich | Germany |
| 1979 | Vienna | Austria |
| 1980 | Basel | Switzerland |
| 1981 | Mainz | Germany |
| 1982 | Beaune | France |
| 1983 | Berlin | Germany |
| 1984 | London | United Kingdom |
| 1985 | Kiel | Germany |
| 1986 | Basel | Switzerland |
| 1987 | New York | United States |
| 1988 | Frankfurt | Germany |
| 1989 | Paris | France |
| 1990 | Oxford | United Kingdom |
| 1991 | Parma | Italy |
| 1992 | Budapest | Hungary |
| 1993 | Antwerp | Belgium |
| 1994 | San Francisco | United States |
| 1995 | Barcelona | Spain |
| 1996 | The Hague | Netherlands |
| 1997 | Reading | United Kingdom |
| 1998 | Lyon | France |
| 1999 | Boston | United States |
| 2000 | Leipzig | Germany |
| 2001 | Copenhagen | Denmark |
| 2002 | Rome | Italy |
| 2003 | Vancouver | Canada |
| 2004 | Prague | Czech Republic |
| 2005 | Helsinki | Finland |
| 2006 | Lisbon | Portugal |
| 2007 | Brighton | United Kingdom |
| 2008 | Saint Petersburg | Russia |
| 2009 | Mexico City | Mexico |
| 2010 | Dublin | Ireland |
| 2011 | Reykjavík | Iceland |
| 2012 | Hong Kong | China |
| 2013 | Amsterdam | Netherlands |
| 2014 | Barcelona | Spain |
| 2015 | São Paulo | Brazil |
| 2016 | Warsaw | Poland |
| 2017 | Montreal | Canada |
| 2018 | Antwerp | Belgium |
| 2019 | Tokyo | Japan |
| 2020 | ATypI All Over | virtual event |
| 2021 | ATypI Tech Talks | virtual event |
| 2021 | ATypI All Over | virtual event |
| 2022 | ATypI Tech Talks | virtual event |
| 2023 | Paris | France |
| 2024 | Brisbane | Australia |
| 2025 | Copenhagen | Denmark |
| 2026 | Stanford | United States |
| 2026 | Sharjah | UAE |

=== Working Seminars ===
As well as the main conference, ATypI Working Seminars have taken place in Basel (1974), Reading (1976), The Hague (1978), Mainz (1981), Stanford (1983), Hamburg (1985), Gdańsk (1988), Budapest (1992), Colombo (2019), Puebla (2019) and Amiens (2020).

== Prix Charles Peignot ==
Every three to six years the ATypI awards the Prix Charles Peignot for Excellence in Type Design to a designer under the age of 35, who has made an outstanding contribution to type design. The recipient is chosen by a committee of ATypI members appointed by the Board. Past winners are: Claude Mediavilla (1982), Jovica Veljović (1985), Petr van Blokland (1988), Robert Slimbach (1991), Carol Twombly (1994), Jean François Porchez (1998), Jonathan Hoefler (2002), Christian Schwartz (2007), Alexandra Korolkova (2013), David Jonathan Ross (2018).
