= Poetica (typeface) =

- Designer: Robert Slimbach
- Commissioned by: Adobe Systems
- Date released: 1992
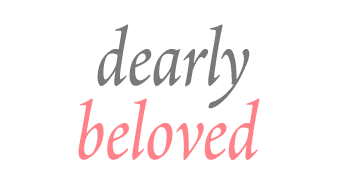
- Sample

Poetica is a calligraphic, ornamental typeface designed by Robert Slimbach for Adobe Systems in 1992. As one of the first of the Adobe Originals family of typefaces including a swash version, it attained a wide usage in digital typography. Regarded as the first family of italic type in digital form, it has 21 stylistic alternates to cater numerous design ideas in a single typeface family.

Poetica features a variety of different ampersand characters.
