= Prix Charles Peignot =

Major award in typeface design, given by the Association Typographique Internationale

The Prix Charles Peignot (Charles Peignot Prize) is a major award in typeface design, given "to a designer under the age of 35 who has made an outstanding contribution to type design". It is awarded irregularly, typically every three to five years, by the Association Typographique Internationale (ATypI, the international typographic association). It was first given in 1982.

The prize is named after Charles Peignot (1897–1983), type designer, director of the Deberny & Peignot type foundry, and founder and first president of ATypI.

== Award winners ==
Winners to date of this award have been:

- Claude Mediavilla (1982)
- Jovica Veljović (1985)
- Petr van Blokland (1988)
- Robert Slimbach (1991)
- Carol Twombly (1994)
- Jean François Porchez (1998)
- Jonathan Hoefler (2002)
- Christian Schwartz (2007)
- Alexandra Korolkova (2013)
- David Jonathan Ross (2018)
