= Minion (typeface) =

Serif typeface

Adobe Minion
- Category: Serif
- Classification: Garalde old-style
- Designer: Robert Slimbach
- Foundry: Adobe Systems
- Date released: 1990

Minion is a serif typeface released in 1990 by Adobe Systems. Designed by Robert Slimbach, it is inspired by late Renaissance-era type and intended for body text and extended reading. Minion's name comes from the traditional naming system for type sizes, in which minion is between nonpareil and brevier, with the type body 7pt in height. As the historically rooted name indicates, Minion was designed for body text in a classic style, although slightly condensed and with large apertures to increase legibility. Slimbach described the design as having "a simplified structure and moderate proportions." The design is slightly condensed, although Slimbach has said that this was intended not for commercial reasons so much as to achieve a good balance of the size of letters relative to the ascenders and descenders.

Minion was developed into a large family using sophisticated interpolation or multiple master technology to create a range of weights and optical sizes suitable for different text sizes. This automation of font creation was intended to create a seamless transition of styles from solid, chunky designs for caption-size small print to more graceful and slender designs for headings. (Note: The original goal was that this would be controllable from inside applications using text, so a user could fine-tune the font to the exact form they needed (thickness, optical size, level of condensation, etc.) Making apps support this proved impractical, and so instead multiple master fonts have been released in a set of styles likely to be useful.) It is an early member of what became Adobe's Originals program, which created a set of type families primarily for book and print use, many like Minion in a deliberately historical, humanist style. (Note: This describes their original design goal: with the growth of webfonts and higher-resolution displays it has become more practical to use them for onscreen use as well.)

Minion is a very large family of fonts, including Greek, Armenian and Cyrillic alphabets, optical sizes, condensed styles and stylistic alternates such as swash capitals. As a standard font in many of Adobe's programs, it is one of the most popular serif typefaces used in books. One of the most famous uses of Minion is The Elements of Typographic Style, Robert Bringhurst's book about fine printing and page layout.

== Releases ==
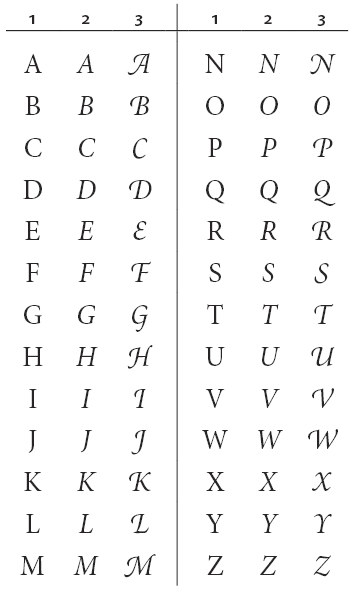
Minion Pro capital letters in (L-R) regular, italic and swash style

Modern Minion releases are in the OpenType (otf) format, allowing a variety of stylistic alternates such as small caps and ligatures to be encoded in the same font. The original release used additional 'expert set' fonts for these features, and may remain used by designers using more primitive software such as Microsoft Office that has limited OpenType support. Like many Adobe fonts, Minion included a 'Th' ligature derived from traditional calligraphy.

=== Minion ===
The original release. Minion Black does not have an italic counterpart. Minion Expert is a separate font package that include fonts containing small caps, ligatures, old style figures, and swash glyphs. There are also fonts for dingbats (Minion Ornaments), and a Black-weighted font (Minion Black Expert). Swash fonts are included for only the 2 lightest font weights. An 'expert set' font is used for older and simpler applications that cannot handle multiple text styles for the same letter (such as both lower-case letters and small caps) in the same font. Slimbach stated, "I saw it as being useful in text applications like newspapers, textbooks, and manuals, as well as signage and titles."

=== Minion Cyrillic ===
Minion Cyrillic was designed in 1992 by Robert Slimbach and was conceived as a non-Latin counterpart to Slimbach's Minion typeface family. There were no Display-sized fonts, expert fonts, or Black-weighted fonts in this family.

=== Minion MM ===
The Multi Master version of the original Minion family, released in 1992. Commonly used in Adobe Acrobat to replace unknown fonts.

=== Minion Std Black ===
An OpenType version of the Minion Black font, but includes features found in Expert versions of PostScript Minion Black fonts. In addition, character set was updated to support Adobe Western 2.

=== Minion Pro ===
An OpenType update of the original family, released in 2000. The update is based on Minion MM but features slight changes to the selection of instances and modifications of the font metrics.

Minion Pro comes with 4 optical sizes (Regular, Caption, Subhead, and Display), 2 widths (Regular and Condensed), 4 weights (Regular, Medium, Semibold, and Bold), each with its respective italic, totaling 64 styles. The Black weight from Minion Black Expert was not included. Each font includes the expert glyphs and dingbats that were previously found in Minion Expert package (swashes available in italic fonts only), Cyrillic Glyphs from Minion Cyrillic. In addition, the font family supports Adobe CE, Adobe Western 2, Greek, Latin Extended, Vietnamese character sets.

Although any of the fonts may be used at any size, the intended point sizes for the designs of this family are:

Optical sizes	Caption	Regular	Subhead	Display
Intended point sizes	6–8.4	8.5–13.0	13.1–19.9	20+

Minion Pro won the bukva:raz! 2001 award under the Greek category.

=== Minion Web ===
A TrueType version of Minion, designed for screen use. It supports ISO-Adobe character set. Version 1.00 of the font was distributed with Internet Explorer 4.0.

=== Minion Web Pro ===
An updated version of Minion Web, which supports Adobe CE and Adobe Western 2 character sets.

=== Minion 3 (2018) ===
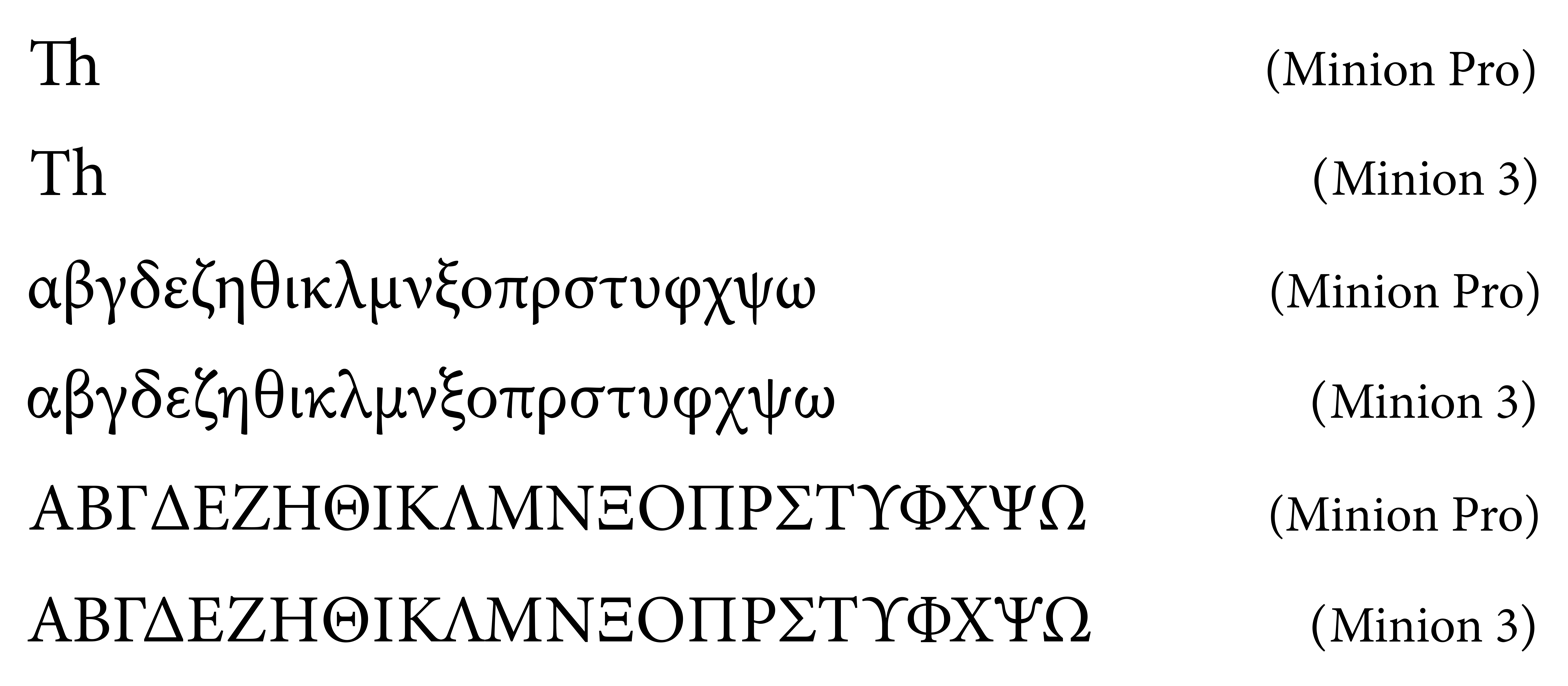
Minion Pro provides the "Th" ligature as a standard ligature, while Minion 3 does not. The Greek characters also have a number of differences.

A rerelease including Armenian, redesigned Greek and Cyrillic characters, full support for International Phonetic Alphabet (IPA), and other modifications. For example, Minion Pro provides the "Th" ligature by default, while Minion 3 only does so when discretionary ligatures are enabled.

Minion 3 comes with 4 optical sizes (Regular, Caption, Subhead, and Display) and 4 weights (Regular, Medium, Semibold, and Bold), each with its respective italic, totaling 32 styles.

Similar to Minion Pro, although any of the fonts may be used at any size, the intended point sizes for the designs of this family are:

Optical sizes	Caption	Regular	Subhead	Display
Intended point sizes	6–9	9–14	14–24	24+

== Reception ==
Minion has generally received praise for its effectiveness as a clean, neutral book face with a very comprehensive range of features and styles. Slimbach himself has described it as "an exercise in restraint", noting that his other old-style serif designs, Arno and Jenson, are more eccentric.

Type designer Matthew Butterick mildly criticised it for being overused: "Minion is beautifully made—it's balanced, it's clean, it's handsome, it's conservative. It's easy to like. And it's been hugely successful as a book font, meaning you will not get fired for using Minion ... [but] Minion succeeds so well in being noncontroversially good-looking that I find it sort of dull."

== Usage ==
- DreamWorks Animation LLC uses Minion Black as its primary logo
- In 2003, Brown University adopted Minion as the typeface for the University logo.
- In 2008, Wake Forest University adopted Minion Pro as its primary serif typeface as part of its project to update the university's visual identity, noting that the font "... exhibits warmth and balance ...".
- Leiden University uses Minion Pro as its primary font, including in its logo.
- Robert Bringhurst's The Elements of Typographic Style (Hartley & Marks, 2008) uses Minion as its body face.
- University of Otago uses Minion as its serif typeface, including in its logo.
- The logo of the Smithsonian is Minion Pro.
- The Cambridge Grammar of the English Language is printed in Adobe Minion.
- In 2019, the Daughters of the American Revolution adopted Minion as their primary font, especially for their logo.
- University of Rome Tor Vergata uses it for its new logo
- Skydance Media and its successor Skydance Corporation uses Minion as its logo font.

== Related typefaces ==
=== Adobe ===
The Latin glyphs of Minion are also used in other Adobe font families created to support non-Latin languages, including Adobe Arabic, Adobe Hebrew, Adobe Thai, and Adobe Song.

==== Adobe Song ====
Adobe Song is marketed as a Simplified Chinese font, but it does contain Traditional Chinese and Japanese characters.

The Latin characters of Adobe Song are lighter variants of Minion's. Interestingly, the main versions of Minion itself (e.g., Minion Pro and Minion 3) do not include any Light weight.

=== Third-party ===
Typefaces included in this section are related to Minion, but are not released by Adobe.

==== Minion Math ====
Minion Math is a mathematical font designed by Johannes Küster from typoma GmbH. It provides Minion with additional glyphs such as mathematical symbols.

Minion Math family includes 20 fonts in 4 weights and 5 optical sizes. Minion Math provides an additional optical size 'Tiny', which is not part of Minion. Version 1.026 contains about 3,300 glyphs in each font style; OpenType math features were added in version 1.020. Minion Math had a working title, typoma MnMath. The final form is expected to include all Unicode mathematical symbols and many additional symbols.

==== MnSymbol ====
A math companion to Minion is Achim Blumensath's MnSymbol, typically (but not necessarily) used from TeX.

MnSymbol is not a full math font, as such it provides mathematical symbols in the style of Minion but not glyphs for Latin characters. A common setup is to use a TeX package which allows users to set an arbitrary font (in this case, Minion) as a math font, then supplement mathematical symbols from MnSymbol. Although MnSymbol has a packaging as OpenType, it only provides TeX font metrics for math.
