= Willow (typeface) =

Name of two typefaces

Willow is the name shared by two typefaces designed in 1990 by competing foundries ITC and Adobe.

== ITC Willow ==
ITC Willow
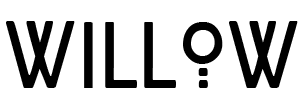
- Category: Decorative
- Designer: Tony Forster
- Foundry: ITC
- Date created: 1990
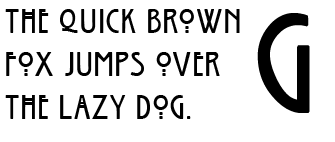
- Sample

ITC Willow was designed by Tony Forster in 1990. Although a contemporary typeface, Willow is the reminiscent of the Scottish Arts and Crafts style made popular by painter and social reformer Jessie Marion King (1875–1949), and architect and designer Charles Rennie Mackintosh (1868–1928) of the Glasgow School. The face is based upon a sign for The Willow Tea Rooms, one of four tea rooms in Glasgow designed by Mackintosh. The typeface is distinct for the double crossbars on the uppercase A and H, and the unusual design of the uppercase O, which is raised above the baseline, with two dots centred beneath the bowl.

== Willow Regular ==
Willow Regular
- Category: Display
- Designer: Joy Redick
- Foundry: Adobe Type
- Date created: 1990

Willow Regular was designed by Joy Redick in 1990, and is part of the Adobe Originals Woodtype Collection.

== Popular culture ==
The American television series American Horror Story and its spin-off series American Horror Stories features a variant of ITC Willow* prominently in the episodes as well as the series logotype itself. The font used was actually a slightly edited version of The Charles Rennie Mackintosh Font, which was purchased specifically to use on the show. This features a modified letter "O" and slightly closer character spacing than the original. Its use was notable among TV and movie buffs since it has never been regarded as synonymous with the horror genre.

The Charles Rennie Mackintosh Font was also used in the motion picture Spider-Man 2. It featured in the display signage for the Broadway play (Oscar Wilde's "The Importance of Being Earnest") in which Mary Jane Watson (Kirsten Dunst), Peter Parker's on-off girlfriend, was appearing. The movie's director, Sam Raimi, spent some time in Glasgow, Scotland, at the Glasgow School of Art, the institute attended by (and later re-designed by) Charles Rennie Mackintosh himself. Raimi became a big fan of Mackintosh's work and specifically asked for this font to be used in the making of the signage.

The City of Berkeley, California uses the Mackintosh font in its logo and official communications.

== See also ==
- Samples of display typefaces
