= Swash (typography) =

Typographical flourish found on some letterforms, particularly in italics

Swashes marked with red color

Minion Pro in capital letters in regular (1), italic (2) and swash (3) style

A swash is a typographical flourish, such as an exaggerated serif, terminal, tail, entry stroke, etc., on a glyph. The use of swash characters dates back to at least the 16th century, as they can be seen in Ludovico Vicentino degli Arrighi's La Operina, which is dated 1522. As with italic type in general, they were inspired by the conventions of period handwriting. Arrighi's designs influenced designers in Italy and particularly in France.

== Typefaces with swashes ==
Most typefaces with swashes are serif fonts, among which (if present) they are often found solely in italics. Advanced digital fonts often supply two italic designs: one with swashes and a more restrained standard italic.

Among old-style typefaces, some releases of Caslon, such as Adobe Caslon, and Garamond, including Adobe Garamond Pro and EB Garamond, have swash designs. Old-style typefaces which include swashes but do not follow a specific historical model include Minion by Robert Slimbach and Nexus by Martin Majoor.

Among transitional typefaces, Baskerville's original design has swashes on J, N, Q and T. Some revivals remove these, while others may add more. Mrs. Eaves has a particularly large number.

Didone fonts with swashes include Surveyor and ITC Bodoni.

Sans-serif fonts with swashes are rarer, but some were released in the Art Deco and Streamline Moderne style of the 1930s, including for Tempo and Semplicità. Classiq by Yamaoka Yasuhiro, based on Garamond, contains swash italic designs, as do Goudy's Sans Serif Light Italic and Mr Eaves by Zuzana Licko, a sans-serif derivative of her serif family Mrs Eaves. Helvetica Flair, a redesign of Helvetica with swashes by Phil Martin, is considered a hallmark of 1970s design, and has never been issued digitally. It is considered to be a highly conflicted design, as Helvetica is seen as a spare and rational typeface and swashes are ostentatious: font designer Mark Simonson described it as "almost sacrilegious". Martin would later recall being accused of "typographic incest" by one German writer for creating it.

As swashes are based on period handwriting, script typefaces with swashes are common, and include Zapf Chancery and Zapfino, both by Hermann Zapf.

Some historical revivals add optional swashes to designs that did not originally have them to produce a more varied design. For example, Adobe Garamond Pro's swash design is based not on the printing of Claude Garamond himself but on designs by his younger contemporary Robert Granjon. The original Caslon italic had swashes only on the letters JQTY; others have been added since by revivals of his designs. (Note: According to Justin Howes, the swash capitals sold by the H.W. Caslon Company in the late 19th to 20th centuries with the Caslon type were "based rather closely on François Guyot's [popular c. 22pt] italic of around 1557 ... found in English printing until the early years of the eighteenth century.")

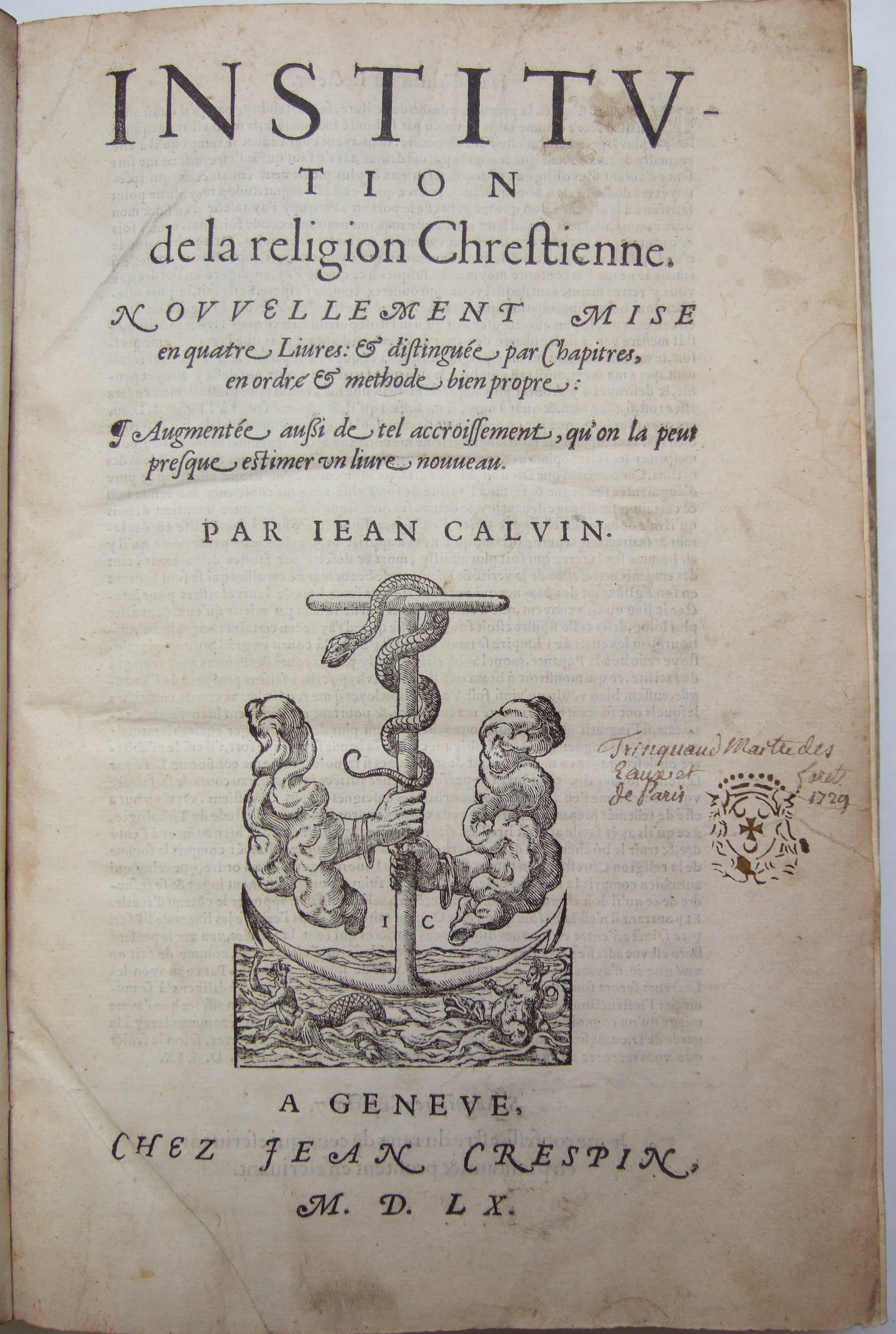
Extensive use of swashes in a 1560 edition of Calvin. Swashes are used on capitals throughout and on many letters at the end of words too. This use would probably now be considered excessive.

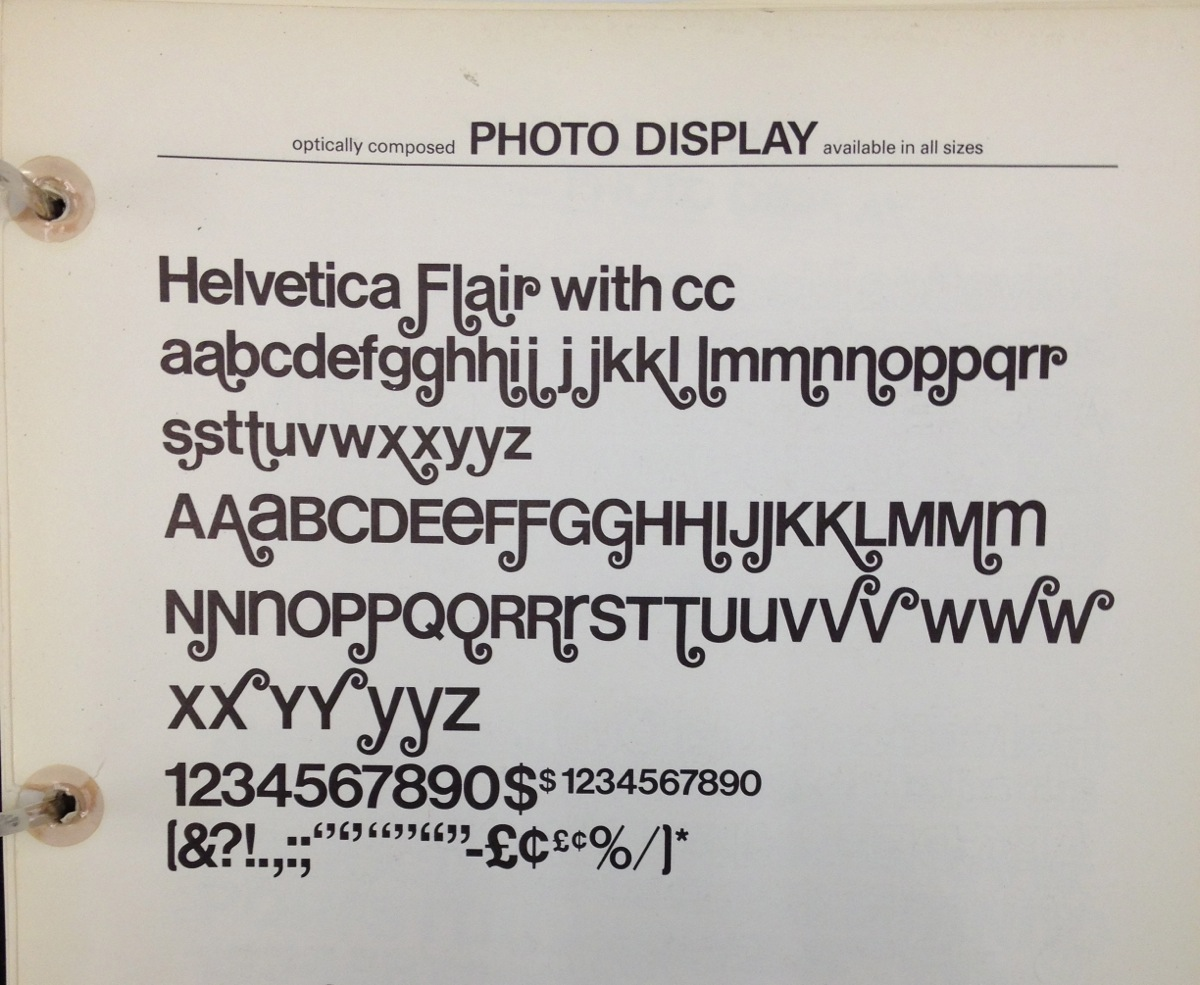
Helvetica Flair, a redesign of the sans-serif font Helvetica with swashes

Flamboyant swashes in the Zapfino typeface
