= Robert Slimbach =

American type designer

- Born: December 15, 1956; Evanston, Illinois
- Occupation: Type designer (1987–)
- Employer(s): Adobe, Inc.
- Awards: Frederic W. Goudy Award, Prix Charles Peignot, SoTA Typography Award, TDC2 Awards

Robert Joseph Slimbach (born 1956) is an American type designer. He is the principal type designer at Adobe, Inc., where he has worked since 1987. He has won many awards for his digital typeface designs, including the rarely awarded Prix Charles Peignot from the Association Typographique Internationale, the SoTA Typography Award, and repeated TDC^{2} awards from the Type Directors Club. His typefaces are among those most commonly used in books.

== Biography ==
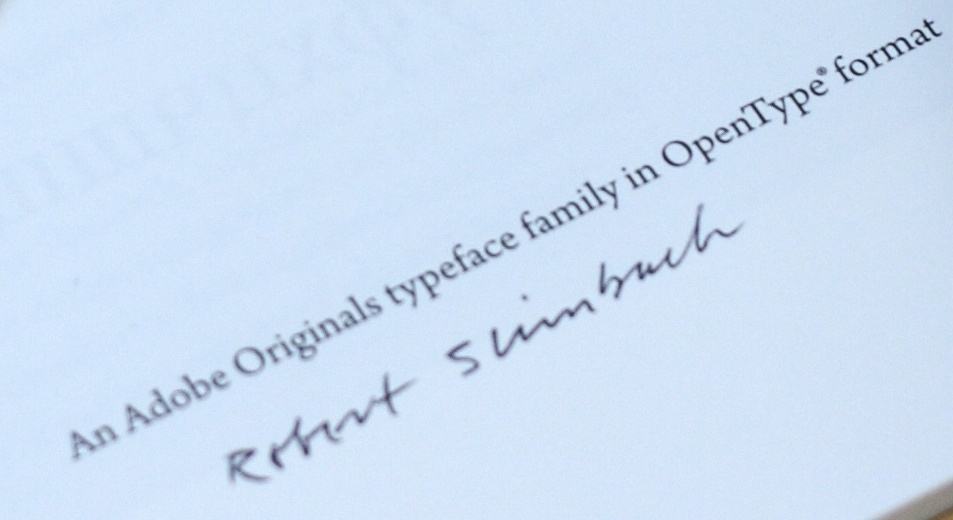
Slimbach's signature on a copy of the Arno Pro specimen.

Slimbach was born in Evanston, Illinois in 1956. Shortly after, he moved to Southern California where he spent his childhood and his youth. After attending UCLA on an athletics scholarship, he developed an interest in graphic design and typefaces while running a small screen printshop for manufacturing posters and greeting cards. This work brought him into contact with Autologic Incorporated in Newbury Park, California. After training from 1983 to 1985, Slimbach worked as a type designer with Autologic Incorporation. There he received further training, not just as a type designer but also as a calligrapher. Slimbach was then self-employed for two years as a freelance type designer, during which developed the two typefaces ITC Slimbach and ITC Giovanni for the International Typeface Corporation. He later commented of this period that "I wasn’t really making enough money to live on."

In 1987 he joined Adobe Systems. Since then, he has concentrated primarily on designing typefaces for digital technology, often drawing inspiration from classical sources. He has developed many new fonts for the Adobe Originals program. Among his early projects at Adobe were the Utopia (1988), Adobe Garamond (1989), Minion (1990) and Poetica (1992) families.

In 1991, he received the Prix Charles Peignot from the Association Typographique Internationale for excellence in type design. More recently, Slimbach's own calligraphy formed the basis for his typeface Brioso. Slimbach has described himself as being particularly interested in humanist and serif projects, calling his work on the neo-grotesque Acumin, in the Swiss modernist style, as being "outside of the design realm I normally prefer."

Since 2000, the rate of Slimbach's (and Adobe's) new typefaces has slowed, as he has taken advantage of the new linguistic and typographic capabilities offered by the OpenType format. Where in the 1990s a given typeface design might be instantiated in one or two fonts, with 200–500 glyphs, a typical new Slimbach work post-2000 has 1500–3000 glyphs. Reviewing Slimbach's 2007 project Arno, font designer Mark Simonson noted that it 'almost becomes a different typeface' when italic alternates are enabled. A hallmark of Slimbach's designs is his use of a 'Th' ligature.

In 2004, Adobe released Garamond Premier Pro, a new take on the Garamond designs, which Slimbach had been working on for 15 years, since he first completed Adobe Garamond in 1989.

Outside of work for public use, Slimbach has designed Adobe's corporate font, Adobe Clean Sans and Adobe Clean Serif, which are used by Adobe in branding and user interfaces. He also designed Adobe Hand B, based on his handwriting, for use in Acrobat's digital signature feature.

In May 2025, long-time former manager at Adobe Type Christopher Slye posted that Slimbach was being "let go by Adobe. He’s near retirement, but I’m disappointed he’s being shown the door rather than leaving on his own terms."

Slimbach has notable skills in several fields other than type design: he went to college on a gymnastics scholarship, and he is an accomplished calligrapher and photographer. His photographic work uses black & white film, and is mainly portraits that examine human foibles and idiosyncrasies.

== Typefaces ==
Before Slimbach came to Adobe, he designed two fonts for the International Typeface Corporation (ITC): ITC Slimbach and ITC Giovanni.

Slimbach typefaces designed before the 2000s were first released in the PostScript Type 1 format, and later re-released in the more capable OpenType format (abbreviated OT in the following table).

Typeface families designed by Robert Slimbach for Adobe Systems
Name	First released	OT re-release (for Type 1 fonts)	Supported scripts	Weights	Optical sizes for OT release	Widths	Notes
Adobe Aldine	2025	—N/a	Latin, Greek, Cyrillic	Regular, Medium, SemiBold, Bold	Yes	Normal	Available in variable font
Adobe Kis	2024 (OT Pro)	—N/a	Latin	Regular, Semibold, Bold	Yes	Normal	Available in variable font
Acumin	2015 (OT Pro)	—N/a	Latin	Thin, Extra-light, Light, Regular, Medium, Semi-bold, Bold, Black, Ultra	No	Extra Condensed, Condensed, Semi Condensed, Normal, Wide	
Adobe Text	2010 (OT Pro)	—N/a	Latin, Greek, Cyrillic	Regular, Semibold, Bold	No	Normal	
Arno	2007 (OT Pro)	—N/a	Latin, Cyrillic, Greek	Light (only at Display size), Regular, Semibold, Bold	Yes	Normal	
Brioso	2003 (OT Pro)	—N/a	Latin	Light, Regular, Medium, Semibold, Bold	Yes	Normal	
Caflisch Script	1993 (Type 1)	2001 (OT Pro)	Latin	Light, Regular, Semibold, Bold	No	Normal	
Cronos	1996 (Type 1)	2002 (OT Pro)	Latin	Light, Regular, Semibold, Bold	Yes	Normal	
Adobe Garamond	1989 (Type 1)	2001 (OT Pro)	Latin	Regular, Semibold, Bold	No	Normal	
Garamond Premier	2005 (OT Pro)	—N/a	Latin, Cyrillic, Greek	Light (only at Display size), Regular, Medium, Semibold, Bold	Yes	Normal	
Adobe Jenson	1996 (Type 1)	2000 (OT Pro)	Latin	Light, Regular, Semibold, Bold	Yes	Normal	
Kepler	1996 (Type 1)	2003 (OT Std)	Latin	Light, Regular, Medium, Semibold, Bold, Black	Yes	Condensed, Semicondensed, Normal, Extended	
Minion	1990 (Latin), 1992 (Cyrillic) (Type 1)	2000 (OT Pro); 2002 (OT Std)	Latin (1990); Cyrillic (1992) (Type 1); Latin, Cyrillic, Greek (2000 OT Pro); (2002 OT Std)	Regular, Medium, Semibold, Bold (2000); Black (2002, no Italic variant)	Yes (2000 release)	Normal, Condensed (2000 release)	
Myriad (with Carol Twombly)	1992 (Type 1)	2000 (OT Pro); 2011 (OT)	Latin (Type 1); Latin, Cyrillic, Greek (2000 OT Pro); Arabic, Hebrew (2011 OT)	Light, Regular, Semibold, Bold, Black	No	Condensed, Semicondensed, Normal, Extended (2000 release)	
Pelago	2017 (OT Pro)	—N/a	Latin, Cyrillic, Greek	Light, Light Text, Regular, Medium, Semibold, Bold	No	Normal	
Poetica	1992 (Type 1)	2003 (OT Pro)	Latin	Regular	No	Normal	
Sanvito	1993 (Type 1)	2002 (OT Pro)	Latin	Light, Regular	Yes	Normal	
Trajan 3 (with Carol Twombly)	2011 (OT Pro)	—N/a	Latin, Cyrillic, Greek	Extralight, Light, Regular, Bold, Black	No	Normal	
Trajan Sans	2011 (OT Pro)	—N/a	Latin, Cyrillic, Greek	Extralight, Light, Regular, Semibold, Bold, Black	No	Normal	
Utopia	1989 (Type 1)	2002 (OT Std)	Latin	Regular, Semibold, Bold, Black (only at Headline size; no italic style)	Yes	Normal	
Warnock	2000 (OT Pro)	—N/a	Latin, Cyrillic, Greek	Light, Regular, Semibold, Bold	Yes	Normal	

=== Awards ===
- Adobe Hand B — 2014 Modern Cyrillic winner
- Adobe Text Pro — 2014 Modern Cyrillic winner
- Arno Pro — TDC2 2007 winning entry
- Brioso Pro — TDC2 2002 winning entry
- Caflisch Script Pro (added many typographic alternates) — bukva:raz! 2001 winner
- Frederick W. Goudy Award — 2018
- Garamond Premier Pro — TDC2 2006 winning entry
- Minion Pro (added Greek) — bukva:raz! 2001 winner
- Myriad Pro (added Greek and Cyrillic, with Carol Twombly, Fred Brady and Christopher Slye) — TDC2 2000 winning entry and bukva:raz! 2001 winner
- Trajan Sans Pro — 2014 Modern Cyrillic winner
- Warnock Pro — TDC2 2001 winning entry
