= Warnock (typeface) =

Old-style serif typeface

- Category: Serif
- Classification: old-style, spur serif
- Designer(s): Robert Slimbach
- Commissioned by: Chris Warnock
- Date created: 2000

Warnock is an old-style typeface commissioned by Chris Warnock in honor of his father, John Warnock, in 1997. It was designed by Robert Slimbach and first published in 2000 as Warnock Pro.
