= Adobe Font Folio =

Collection of OpenType fonts

- Developer(s): Adobe Systems
- Platform: OpenType
- Available in: English; Japanese
- Type: Computer font
- License: Commercial proprietary software
- Website: adobe.com/products/fontfolio.html

Adobe Font Folio was a collection of more than 2,400 OpenType fonts, designed by several renowned type foundries. As of early 2005, there were around 10,000 fonts available in OpenType format. Adobe's font library makes up under a third of the total, all of which are included in Font Folio.

The product was discontinued in June 2022.

== Version history ==
- Version 7, released March 13, 1995. Had over 2,000 Type 1 (PostScript) typefaces. First release supporting Silicon Graphics and Sun Microsystems platforms.
- Version 8, released in September, 1997.
- Version 9, released in January, 2001. Had some OpenType typefaces, but still predominantly PostScript Type 1.
- Version 10. Marketed as Font Folio Opentype Edition, released August 11, 2003, claiming "more than 2,000" fonts in OpenType format. Offered as a 20-user license and, for the first time, a 10-user license to make it more affordable.
- Version 11. Released September 5, 2007, touting more than 2,300 fonts (all OpenType).
- Version 11.1. Released December 21, 2011. The collection has 2,433 OpenType fonts.

== See also ==
- Adobe Fonts
- Adobe Originals
- Adobe Type
