= Adobe Fonts =

Subscription service for fonts

- Manufacturer: Adobe Systems
- Type: Design Service
- Released: November 9, 2009
- Introductory price: Free trial Annual subscriptions
- Online services: Embedded fonts
- Website: fonts.adobe.com

Adobe Fonts (formerly Typekit) is an online service that provides its subscribers with access to its font library, under a single licensing agreement. The fonts may be used directly on websites, or synced via Adobe Creative Cloud to applications on the subscriber's computers.

Adobe Fonts was launched as Typekit in November 2009 by Small Batch, Inc., a company run by creators of the Google Analytics service. In October 2011, the service was acquired by Adobe. On October 15, 2018, Typekit changed its name to Adobe Fonts.

Adobe Fonts offers over 30,000 fonts as of November 2024. These fonts can be used for both personal and commercial purposes. Accessible with a Creative Cloud subscription, Adobe Fonts provides access to a wide selection of fonts from 150 different type foundries.

Adobe has also partnered with Monotype, which helps streamline the management of enterprise font licenses for businesses. The collaboration with Monotype makes Adobe Originals, a set of exclusive fonts created by Adobe, more accessible to brands and designers. The mixture of these features seeks to support design needs, from individual projects to large-scale commercial use.

== See also ==
- Adobe Font Folio
- Adobe Originals
