= Carol Twombly =

American designer (born 1959)

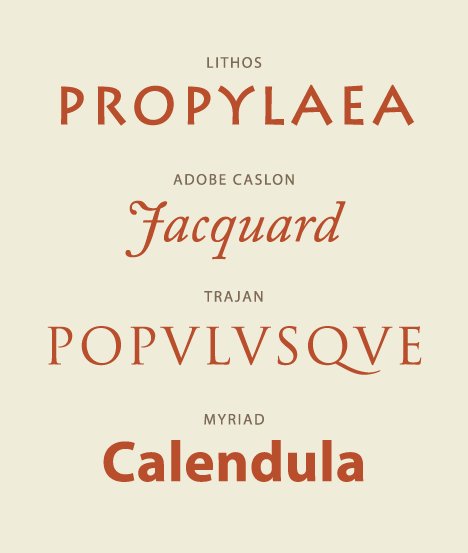
- Specimens of typefaces by Carol Twombly
- Born: June 13, 1959 (age 67); Concord, Massachusetts, U.S.
- Education: Rhode Island School of Design; Stanford University
- Known for: Typography, digital fonts
- Notable work: Adobe Caslon (1990); Charlemagne (1989); Lithos (1989); Myriad (1991, designed with Robert Slimbach); Trajan (1989)

Carol Twombly (born June 13, 1959) is an American designer, best known for her type design. She worked as a type designer at Adobe Systems from 1988 through 1999, during which time she designed, or contributed to the design of, many typefaces, including Trajan, Myriad and Adobe Caslon.

Twombly retired from Adobe and from type design in early 1999, to focus on her other design interests, involving textiles and jewelry.

A biography of Twombly and her type design career by Nancy Stock-Allen was published in 2016.

== Education ==
Carol Twombly was born June 13, 1959, in Concord, Massachusetts. She attended and graduated from the Rhode Island School of Design (RISD) where she first studied sculpture, and later changed her major to graphic design. She credits her professors Charles Bigelow and Kris Holmes, whose studio she worked in, for her inspiration and stimulating her interest in typography. Gerard Unger, a visiting instructor at RISD during Twombly's time as a student, also influenced her work. At Stanford University Twombly was one of only five people to graduate from the short-lived digital typography program with Masters of Science degrees in computer science and typographic design.

== Career ==
Twombly joined Adobe in 1988. One of her first projects at Adobe was Trajan. As a designer, Twombly closely studied historical scripts for inspiration in creating digital fonts. She successfully translated Roman inscriptions – stone carvings on Trajan's Column – into a modern digital design: the typeface Trajan, in 1989. She next drew upon her background as a calligrapher and interest in paleography to translate Carolingian versals, or decorative capital letters, into a digital typeface called Charlemagne (also in 1989). The specific source was a page of the Anglo-Saxon Benedictional of Saint Æthelwold in the British Library. Similarly, Twombly based Lithos on historical precedents, although more generally to ancient Greek inscriptions, rather to any specific models. Adobe marketed Trajan, Charlemagne, and Lithos as "Modern Ancients." In designing Adobe Caslon, she also examined closely the well-known eighteenth-century typeface designed by William Caslon to create a modern digital equivalent. She collaborated with Robert Slimbach to create the sans-serif Myriad, her first completely original typeface design.

== Awards ==
In her first international type design competition, Twombly was awarded the Morisawa gold prize for her typeface design in 1984. Subsequently, Morisawa Ltd., a Japanese typesetting manufacturer and the sponsor of the competition, licensed and marketed her entry as the Mirarae typeface. Twombly was also the 1994 winner of the Prix Charles Peignot, given by the Association Typographique Internationale (ATypI) – the first woman, and second American, to receive this award given to a promising typeface designer under the age of 35.

== Typefaces by Twombly ==
- Specimen of Carol Twombly's Trajan typeface
  Adobe Caslon (1990)
- Californian FB (roman only)
- Chaparral (1997)
- Charlemagne (1989)
- Lithos (1989)
- Mirarae (1984)
- Myriad (1991, designed with Robert Slimbach)
- Nueva (1994)
- Trajan (1989)
- Viva (1993)

Under Twombly's art direction, fonts such as Ponderosa, Pepperwood, Zebrawood, and Rosewood, were part of an Adobe project to revive American display typefaces in wood type from the 1880s. After this series, she went on to design two more typefaces for Adobe: Nueva, an original design, and Chaparral, which references nineteenth-century slab serif forms and sixteenth-century roman book hand, a calligraphic form. She designed Chaparral in collaboration with calligrapher Linnea Lundquist.

== Retirement ==
Twombly left Adobe in 1999. Speaking in 2014, she cited a variety of reasons for the decision, including a lack of interest in designing fonts for onscreen display and the market failure of Adobe's multiple master font technology. She is currently an independent artist, specializing in drawing, painting on textiles, beading shekeres, and basket-making.

== Sources ==
- Carol Twombly - Adobe Type Designers
- Interview
- Linotype Biography of Carol Twombly
