= Jovica Veljović =

Serbian type designer and calligrapher (born 1954)

Jovica Veljović (pronounced [̩ˌjôʋit͜sa ˈʋêːʎoʋit͜ɕ]; born 1954) is a Serbian type designer and calligrapher. He is a professor for type design at the Hamburg University of Applied Sciences.

In 1985, Veljović was awarded the Prix Charles Peignot, an infrequently awarded prize for type design.

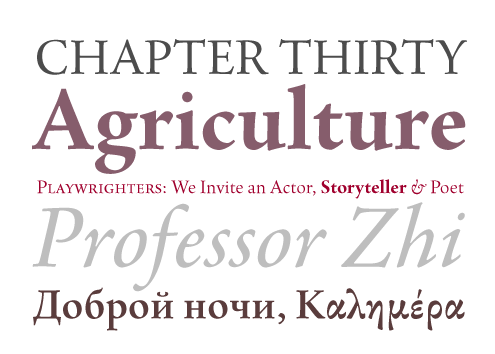
Specimen image of Veljović's Agmena family

His designs include ITC Veljović and Esprit for ITC, Sava, Silentium and Ex Ponto for Adobe, and Libelle, Veljović Script and Agmena for Linotype. He also has worked as a consultant to URW.
