= Justin Howes =

British historian (1963–2005)

Justin Howes (1963–2005) was a British historian of printing and lettering.

Howes was a curator of the Type Museum of London and wrote on the work of Edward Johnston and William Caslon; his book Johnston's Underground Type on the Johnston lettering commissioned and used by London Underground and its predecessors remains the standard work on the topic. He also worked as a book and font designer and was working on a PhD at the time of his death.

The St Bride Foundation holds the annual Justin Howes Memorial Lecture at which scholars and practitioners of typography are invited to present a talk.
