= Cigno =

Cigno is the Italian word for 'swan' and may refer to:

- The Cigno typeface created by Aldo Novarese, art director of Nebiolo Printech
- Osvaldo Cigno, a percussionist on Eddie Harris' album Bossa Nova
- The Cigno series of Italian torpedo boats of the Pegaso-class
- "Cigno Nero", a song by the Italian rapper Fedez (Federico Leonardo Lucia)
