= Giulio da Milano =

Italian painter, teacher and graphic designer

Giulio da Milano (Nice, 1895 - Turin, 1990) was an Italian painter, teacher and graphic designer. He worked on printing, layout and on several forms of typographic illustrations. He also taught for many years at the Turin graphic design school.

In 1934, he published Veltro (named after an Italian dog similar to the greyhound), an expressive, monolinear script typeface that became very popular in Italy among printers that couldn't afford to hire lettering artists for every titling design job. In 1933, he was invested as the director of the art department of the Nebiolo type foundry.

In 1935, he created the Neon and Razionale geometric typefaces for that same company. Neon's strokes were always the same width, and the uppercase and lowercase letters have exactly the same height. Each body size had a different height-width proportion, and there were three possible weight series: chiara (light), nera (black) and ombrata (shadowed, letters featured a shadow effect). Razionale was designed as a grid-like counter, so the printed elements were actually the spaces between the letters. Other quadrangular printing blocks could be added to complete the designs, change the spacing and create geometric shapes. In 1936, Giulio da Milano was succeeded in the direction of Nebiolo by designer and collaborator Alessandro Butti.

== Legacy ==
In 2004, Rebecca Alaccari (also known as Canada Type) published Gala, a modern take on the design of the Neon typeface, at the Lineto Swiss type foundry. Veltro was also digitised and expanded by Ralph M. Unger, and published by the Profonts type foundry in 2007.
