= Fenice =

Fenice may refer to:

- Fenice, a font designed by Aldo Novarese (1977)
- La Fenice, an Italian opera house in Venice, one of the most famous theatres in Europe

== See also ==
- Phoenice, a town and Catholic titular bishopric in Greece, whose Italian name is Fenice
