= Inés Joyes y Blake =

Spanish translator and writer

- Born: 27 December 1731; Madrid, Spain
- Died: 1808 (aged 76–77); Vélez-Málaga, Spain
- Occupations: Translator, writer

Inés Joyes y Blake (27 December 1731 – 1808) was a Spanish translator and writer of the Age of Enlightenment. She became known in the field of letters with her translation of the novel The History of Rasselas, Prince of Abissinia by Samuel Johnson. Her edition of this work includes a text of her own, entitled "Apología de las mujeres", which constitutes one of the first feminist essays in Spain.

== Biography ==
Inés Joyes y Blake was born in Madrid into a Catholic family, with a French mother and an Irish father. Like many Irish families settled in Spain at the time, hers belonged to the world of the business bourgeoisie, making their fortune around large cities and especially in the capital. It must have been a family with a certain cultural level, and their comfortable social position allowed Ines access to a deeper intellectual education than most of her contemporaries. She spoke several languages, including English, French, and Spanish, and participated in gatherings and cultural meetings organized by Enlightenment figures.

In 1752, she married the merchant Agustín Blake, a relative on her mother's side, in what was an arranged marriage, serving social equilibrium and economic convenience. The couple had nine children – five boys and four girls – over twenty years. They maintained extensive family relationships and with influential people in local society. However, Joyes is not known for public activities beyond her family responsibilities or indirect involvement in business. First they settled in Málaga, and from 1767 to 1771 in Vélez-Málaga, where her husband had business, which she would later take over after his death in 1782. Inés would live in Málaga until her death in 1808.

Inés Joyes did not lose her connection with the Irish culture and its language. Thanks to this, in 1798, she translated the English philosophical novel The History of Rasselas, Prince of Abissinia by Samuel Johnson, this being its first translation into Spanish. In it, Inés also included a text in the form of a letter, "Apología de las mujeres" (Apology of Women), constituting her only surviving work. At that time, she was 67 years old and represented the most advanced ideas about women in the Enlightenment era, forming part of that group of women in Spain and Europe that began to break through and make evident the inequalities of gender present in Western society.

However, the life of Joyes was discreet, like that of so many women of her time. Her translation and work went unnoticed, with recent analysis of her text shedding light on the relevance that she could have had to the feminist thought of her time.

== Work and thought ==
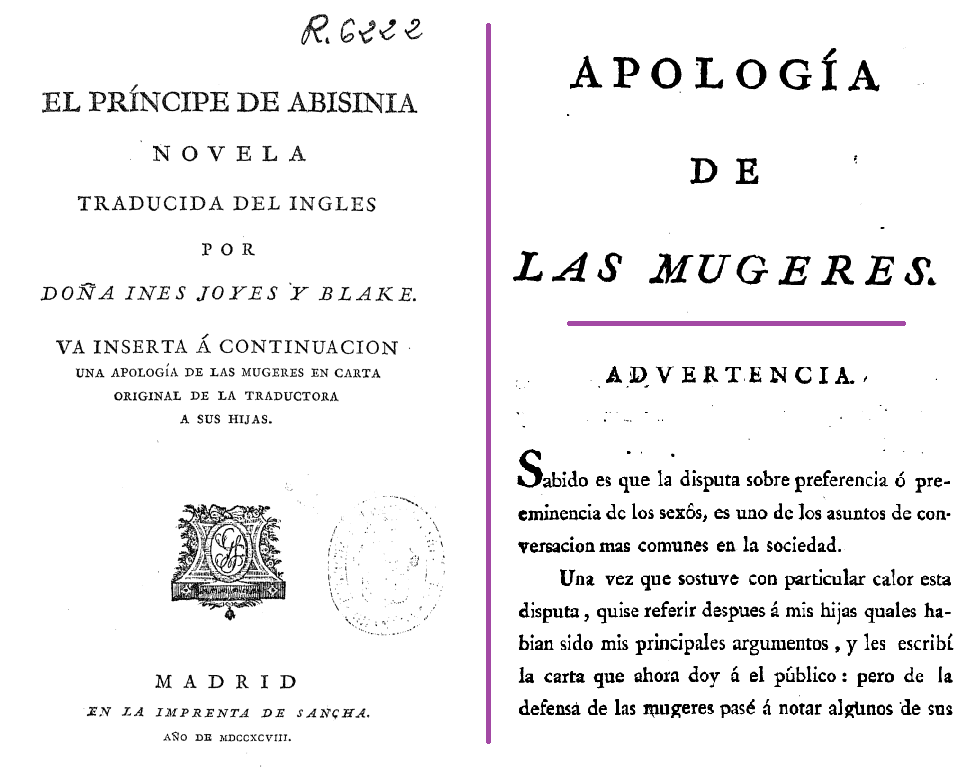
Her translation of the novel The History of Rasselas, Prince of Abissinia by Samuel Johnson (on left) includes one of the first feminist essays in Spain (on the right)

"Apología de las mujeres" is an essay that Joyes dedicated to her daughters, and that she wrote in epistolary mode as an appendix to her translation of Rasselas, Prince of Abissinia. It deals with the situation of women in their time, denouncing the poor education they received, the inequality and double standards that they observed in society.

The text is written in the first person, and this fact serves to support her arguments, as it gives them validity from her own experience. It offers an image of the family far from the idealization of the literature of the time. She shares that the family is a social and educational institution that is the basis of society, but in which women do not have high expectations of development, and in which their identity and social consideration are linked to marriage.

In her feminist contribution through this essay, Joyes shows the relationship of women with the public sphere in 18th-century Spain. In turn, she defends the exercise of reason by women, in an attempt to make them aware of their own intellectual capacity and their worth, trying to maintain their confidence in the face of male opinion. She firmly denounces social inequalities and interests that limited the ability of women, to confine them to family life, showing special concern for the education of women and the role that they played in society.

Regarding education, she takes up the analysis made by Marquise de Lambert, who affirmed that keeping women in ignorance hid a clear purpose of male domination, and explains that family and marriage are not the only paths to the fulfillment of women. In this sense, she encourages women to also find emotional satisfaction in activities such as reading or studying.

One criticism that stands out in Joyes' work is that related to the moral double standard that proposed very different demands for men and women in family matters, of life choices, etc. This would constitute an important contribution in a subject in that other intellectuals of the time did not investigate. It exposed the situation of discrimination to which they were subjected, advocating a change in customs and an equal evaluation of relations between the sexes. In this text, Joyes exhorts women to assume an intellectual, moral, and sentimental autonomy with which to establish their happiness, and this reveals elements of her personality: lucid, risky, not at all conformist with the feminine models imposed by enlightened rationalism and sentimental philosophy: the excellence of motherhood and the happiness of conjugal and domestic life.

Apologia is part of a long tradition of debate about women. In 1726 Father Feijóo published Defensa de las mujeres, which provoked a great controversy and led to an avalanche of texts on the nature, morals, and education of women. The 1790s saw a radicalization of critical discourse and the demands of women throughout Europe. However, as in other writings published in those years such as Josefa Amar's El discurso sobre la educación física y moral de las mujeres, the contribution of Joyes is mainly about the inequalities of women in the private sphere and in social spaces: family, education, romantic and social relationships, judgment, and writing. Being familiar with Enlightenment ideas, it is possible that Inés Joyes read her contemporary Mary Wollstonecraft's A Vindication of the Rights of Woman, and that is why certain features of her work can be observed in "Apología de las mujeres".

The impact that "Apología" had on her contemporaries was minimal, at least in print. Although its appearance was heralded with two announcements in the Gaceta and Diario de Madrid, it was not reissued until 2009. In fact, subsequent translators of Rasselas in 1813, 1831, and 1860 did not mention it.

== See also ==
- Josefa Amar y Borbón, 18th-century Spanish writer and translator
- Margarita Hickey, 18th-century Spanish poet, translator, and geographer
