= Bernhard Gothic =

Geometric sans-serif typeface

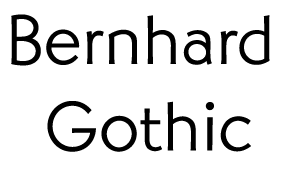
- Category: Sans-serif
- Classification: Geometric
- Designer: Lucian Bernhard
- Foundry: American Type Founders
- Date released: 1929 - 30
- Re-issuing foundries: Intertype
- Design based on: Futura, Kabel
- Also known as: Greeting Gothic
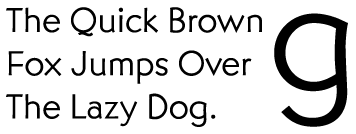
- Sample

Bernhard Gothic is a family of geometric sans serif typeface designed by Lucian Bernhard in 1929 for the American Type Founders (ATF). Five variations by Bernhard were introduced over two years:

- Bernhard Gothic Medium (1929)
- Bernhard Gothic Light (1930)
- Bernhard Gothic Light Italic (1930)
- Bernhard Gothic Medium Italic (1930)
- Bernhard Gothic Heavy (1930)
- Bernhard Gothic Extra Heavy (1931)

A final member of the family, Bernhard Gothic Medium Condensed, was introduced by ATF in 1936, but it is unclear as to who the designer was.

Bernhard Gothic is more organic and less regular than other geometric sans-serif typefaces, including Futura, Kabel, and Twentieth Century, showing influence of Bernhard's earlier more expressionistic faces. It is a "spurless" design, similar to the contemporary Semplicità and Universal Grotesk and more recently FF Dax, in which the majority of strokes end without terminals. This gives an effect of modernism, detached from handwriting conventions.

== Hot metal copies ==
Intertype's 1936 copy was called Greeting Gothic.

== Digital copies ==
Digital copies are available from Elsner+Flake, Font Company, URW++, Berthold, Spiece Graphics, Monotype Imaging and FontHaus.
