= Rasse =

Rasse may refer to:

- Small Indian civet
- Masaki Okimoto, Japanese professional wrestler, whose stage name is Rasse
- Rasse (typeface), a foundry type made by Ludwig & Mayer.
