= Rusher's Patent Types =

1804 typeface without descending characters

An 1856 lithograph and 1802 engraving reproducing the drawing in Rusher's patent filing. (Note: The original patent filing has not been viewed as part of writing this article. It is not known which of these is a more accurate reproduction of Rusher's drawing.)

Rusher's Patent Types were the characters of an experimental serif typeface invented, patented and promoted by Philip Rusher in Banbury, England, from 1802 onwards. (Note: The plural "Patent Types" is the title on the book, but as described below it appears only one typeface in one size was ever made.) The typeface removed the descenders from the lower-case letters and shortened the ascenders, which Rusher hoped would make the typeface "more uniform" and save paper. The typeface was used for a few books but did not become popular.

== Patent ==
Rusher patented the design on 20 May 1802, stating that by his invention "the letters will occupy less room...each line may be placed immediately under the body of the preceding line, and thus a great part of the paper...may be saved, or spaces may be placed between the lines to extend them to the usual distance asunder. In either case the printing will appear more uniform and beautiful". Rusher's patent showed a design for the roman or upright style, and for an italic apparently never manufactured as metal type.

Rusher gave his occupation as bankers' clerk in the patent; he became manager of the town's Old Bank. However, his brother William Rusher, originally a schoolmaster, had become a bookseller and stationer in the town by 1785, became parish clerk in 1795 and reached a prominent position in the town as a printer of directories and guides to reading and arithmetic. William Rusher's son John Golby Rusher would become a long-lived and successful publisher who continued to sell books in the town for over three decades, particularly known for his books of nursery rhymes which were distributed nationally.

An 1802 review of patents in The Monthly Magazine expressed interest: "although the alterations in several of the letters...do not appear necessary, yet we cannot help thinking that his plan...would add greatly to the beauty of fine printing; and it is obvious that most of the characters already in use might still be employed in the business, consequently the expence in adopting this invention could not be very great." The patent was also reported in Germany and later in the Netherlands.

== Rasselas ==
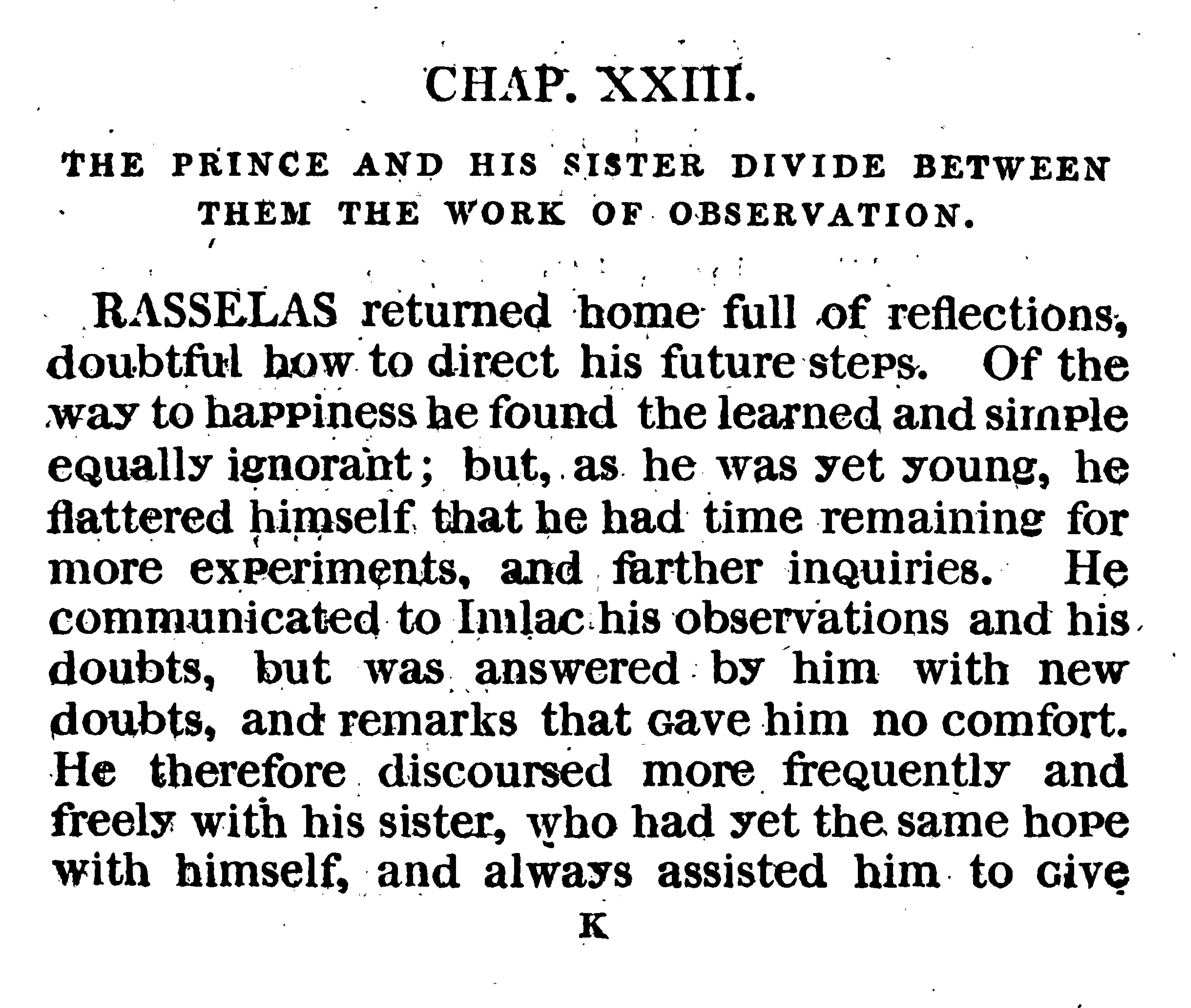
Page 61 of Philip Rusher's edition of Rasselas. This section uses a small cap 'g' at the start of words.

Rusher commissioned custom metal type characters, or sorts, from the Caslon Type Foundry in London, to adapt a 14-point size type they sold. (Note: The type used was described as their English No. 1 typeface. "English" was the traditional name used at the time for any 14pt type; it does not make any comment about the type's design or other characteristics.) According to Frederic Goudy, in 1894 the punches used to create the type were rediscovered by the foundry during a stock check. Rusher's characters were only the lower-case b d f h k l g j p y characters and fi ff ligatures; (Note: Goudy does not state a source for his information. An 1894 article of Caslon's Circular, the Caslon Foundry's news magazine, cited by Cheney's corporate history but which could not be viewed for writing this article, may have been his source; see below. Goudy does not list an 'fl' ligature, but it seems one was made, since it appears in the text (see photo) and was normal in fonts of the period.) as The Monthly Magazine had predicted, the originals were used for the other letters. A small capital was used for the q, although Rusher's patent shows a cursive form (and alternative cursive forms for the ascending characters with forward-facing serifs, not used in the type as made). The reduction in the height of the ascenders increases the apparent x-height relative to the ascending characters.

The type adapted was a modern face or Didone type, a style of typeface which had recently become popular and would remain the standard typeface for general-purpose printing for the whole of the nineteenth century. (Note: The Caslon foundry had in the previous decade added modern-face types to their stock for the first time, which were first cut by John Isaac Drury.)

As a first use for his "new mode of printing", in 1804 Rusher published an edition of Rasselas, a novel by Samuel Johnson which was popular at the time. It was printed by Cheney (later Cheney & Sons), a local firm of printers in Banbury, and advertised as sold by three booksellers in London and a relative, J. Rusher, in Reading. A copy at the University of Oxford advertises that "since part of the book was printed, it will be seen that a material improvement has been made in the legibility of the new letters." The form of the 'g' varies, in Goudy's view reflecting a change in editing policy midway through the printing process: in some places the sort used is always the lower-case form with no descender, in others a small cap character was used at the beginning of words. Goudy also thought the patented characters were altered after part of the book was printed by slimming them down. Edwin Pearson, who wrote a history of children's books printed in Banbury in 1890, had information that sales of the book had grossed £5 5s.

Retrospective reviews of the type have not been favourable. In the nineteenth century Charles Henry Timperley felt that the improved types were "any thing but what the preamble of the patent would have us believe" and Bigmore and Wyman considered it "about as ugly a specimen of typography as can be conceived". Goudy thought that the design was hampered by bad execution: "little care had been taken to give to his new forms the same weight of stems as in the face into which they were interpolated". Alastair Johnston felt that the type is "anything but uniform and beautiful" and that the new characters felt particularly uncomfortable in the word Egypt, where a large part of the novel is set: "that word, with its three descending letters in an awkward huddle, pops up frequently."

== Later history ==
A few more uses were made of the type. The book advertised a forthcoming edition of The Deserted Village in the type, and the Cheney ledger suggested it was apparently printed, but no copy has been found. (Note: For comparison, quite a large number of the Rasselas are known: copies exist at the British Library, Oxford, St Bride Library, formerly owned by William Blades, San Francisco Public Library, and one was also owned by Goudy. As of 2021, copies on AbeBooks retailed for around $275.) Philip Rusher made another try with a pamphlet, The Farmer's Friend in 1817, and his nephew John Golby Rusher used the type in 1852 for another book, A Complete Guide to the Mystery and Management of Bees by William White. The typeface after this again remained unused.

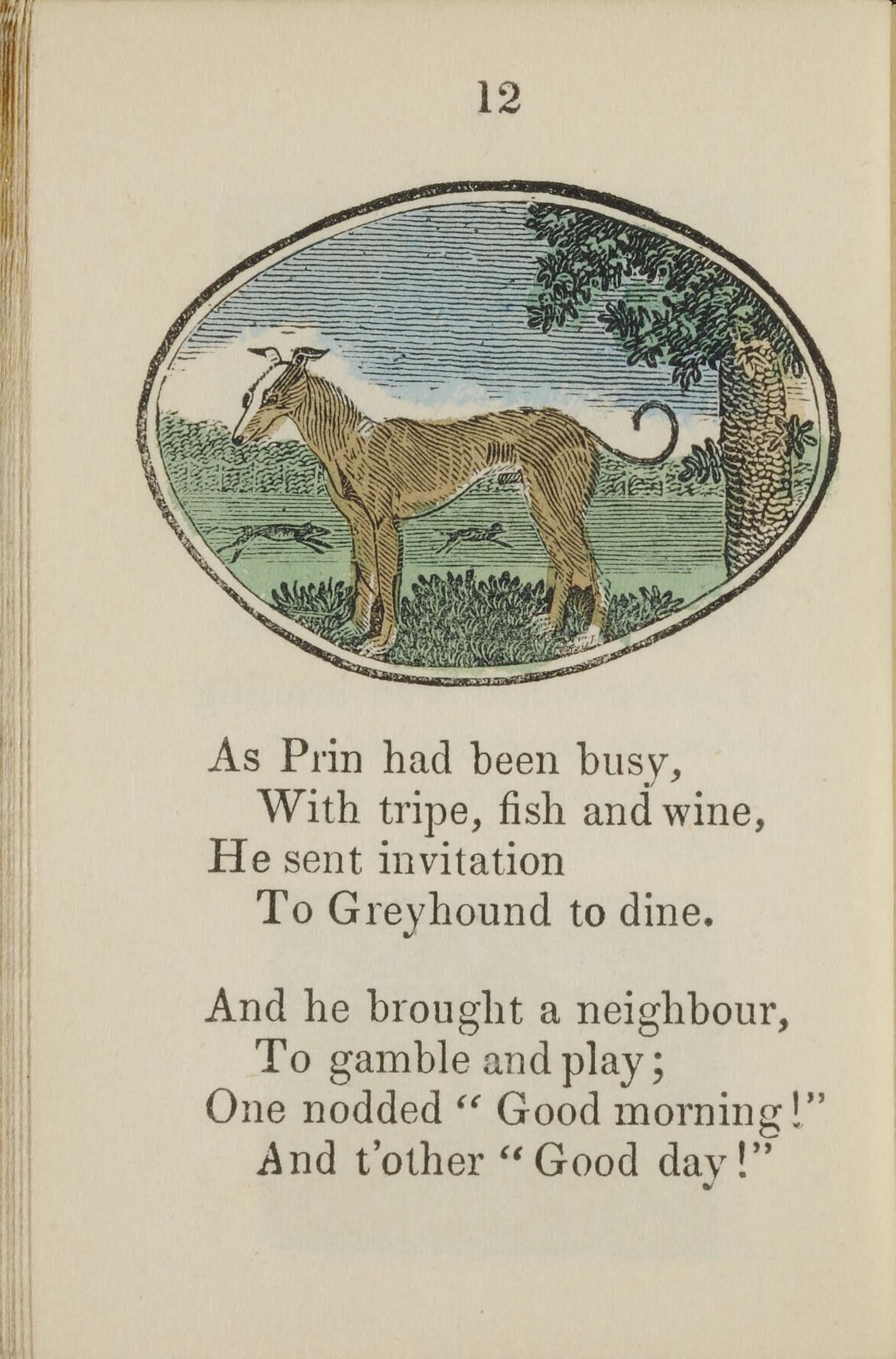
Philip Rusher's nephew John Golby Rusher became a successful publisher in Banbury for many years, often printing nursery rhymes such as Old Mother Hubbard and Jack and Jill. This 1840 book does not use Rusher's types.

According an 1894 article on the type in Caslon's Circular, the news magazine of the Caslon foundry, from when the punches were rediscovered, "whether this patent type gave rise to the practice or not, we cannot tell, but very many of the best fonts issued at the present day can be supplied on various bodies for which special ascending and descending sorts have been engraved, but to do away with descenders entirely...has never been since attempted". (Note: Since this was written, a few display typefaces in the Latin alphabet have appeared with descenders removed: the Art Nouveau Hobo and Permanent Headline. James Millington also created letterforms with neither ascenders nor descenders, but this was less of a serious proposal. Libé, later Media Sans, the headline face of Libération has very short descenders. Spelling of quote modernised to avoid confusion; "fount" was the usual spelling at the time.)

The punches were advertised for sale on eBay in February 2021; they had apparently ended up owned by Cheney & Sons, the firm which had printed the book, before it closed. They were acquired by St Bride Library.

== Similar dot-matrix fonts ==
In the second half of the 20th century, early dot-matrix printers and computer displays had restricted character heights (often 5×7 pixels or similar) with insufficient room for descenders, so relevant lower case letters were modified to stay on the baseline. By contrast, later fonts without this constraint were described as having 'true descenders'.

== See also ==
- Alphabet 26
