= Pietro Napoli Signorelli =

Italian scholar and historian (1731–1815)

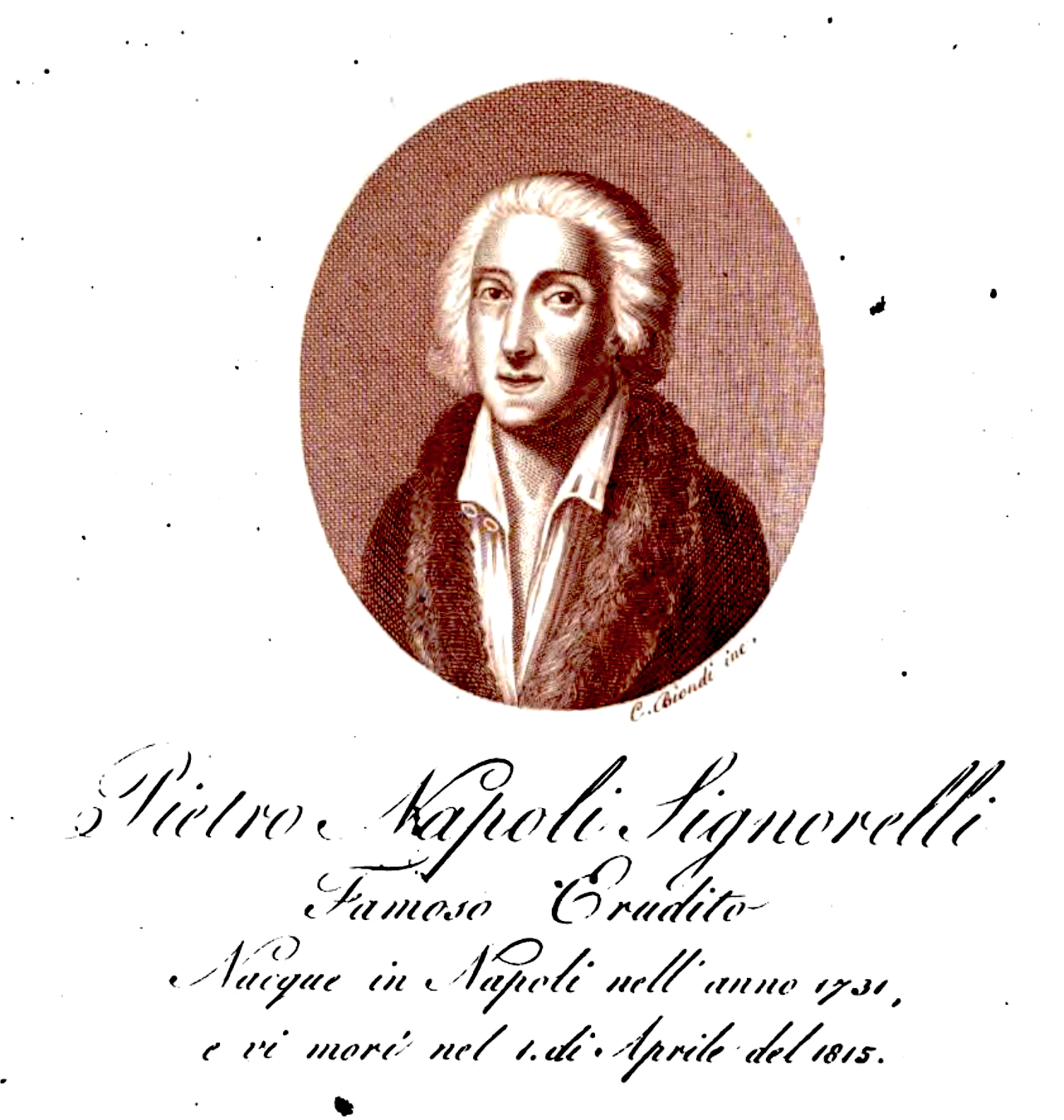
- Born: 28 September 1731; Naples
- Died: 1 April 1815 (aged 83); Naples

Academic background
- Education: University of Naples Federico II

Academic work
- Discipline: history classical literature
- Institutions: University of Bologna
- Notable works: Critique and history of antique and modern theater

Pietro Napoli Signorelli (28 September 1731 – 1 April 1815) was an Italian scholar of classic literature, mainly drama, and historian.

== Biography ==
He was born in Naples to a father who was a notary, and initially trained as a lawyer, including under Antonio Genovesi. But in 1765, he traveled to Madrid, Spain. In Spain, where he joined a circle of writers (tertulia literaria) interested in writing dramas. In Spain, he wrote two of his most successful works: "Critique and history of antique and modern theater" and "Events of the Culture of the Two Sicilies".

He returned to Naples where in 1784 he served as secretary of the local literary academy. However, his flirtations with antimonarchical enlightenment theory caused him legal tribulations. In 1798, he formed part of the legislative council of the short-lived Parthenopean Republic. With the Bourbon restoration, he went into exile in Milan, where he was named professor of dramatic arts for the Brera Academy. He then gained an appointment as professor of diplomacy and history at the University of Bologna. He returned to Naples in 1806, and died there in 1813.

== Works ==
Among his works are:

- Six Satires (Genoa, 1774)
- Storia critica dei teatri antichi e moderni (Naples, 1777)
- Faustina, commedia in 5 atti in versi (Lucca, 1779)
- Quadro dello stato attuale delle scienze e della letteratura in Spagna (Madrid, 1780, octavo)
- Discorso storico critico sui saggi apologetici dell abate Lampillas (Naples, 1782)
- Vicende della cultura delle Due Sicilie (1785)
- Orazione funebre per Carlo III re delle Spagna (1789)
- Regno di Ferdinando IV (1798 quarto)
- Prolusione alla cattedra di poesia rappresentativea (1801)
- Ragionamento sul gusto (1802)
- Lettera sullo spettacolo musicale del 1803 (1804 in octavo)
- Elementi di critica diplomatica, con istoria preliminare (1803)
- Elogio storico by Francesco Maria Avellino (Naples, 1813)
