= Simonini (disambiguation) =

Simonini may refer to:

- Simonini Racing, Italian automotive and aircraft engine manufacturer
- Simonini, a number of engines manufactured by Simonini Racing
- Simonini (surname)
- Simonini reaction

== See also ==
- Simoncini
