= Bradbury Thompson =

American graphic designer

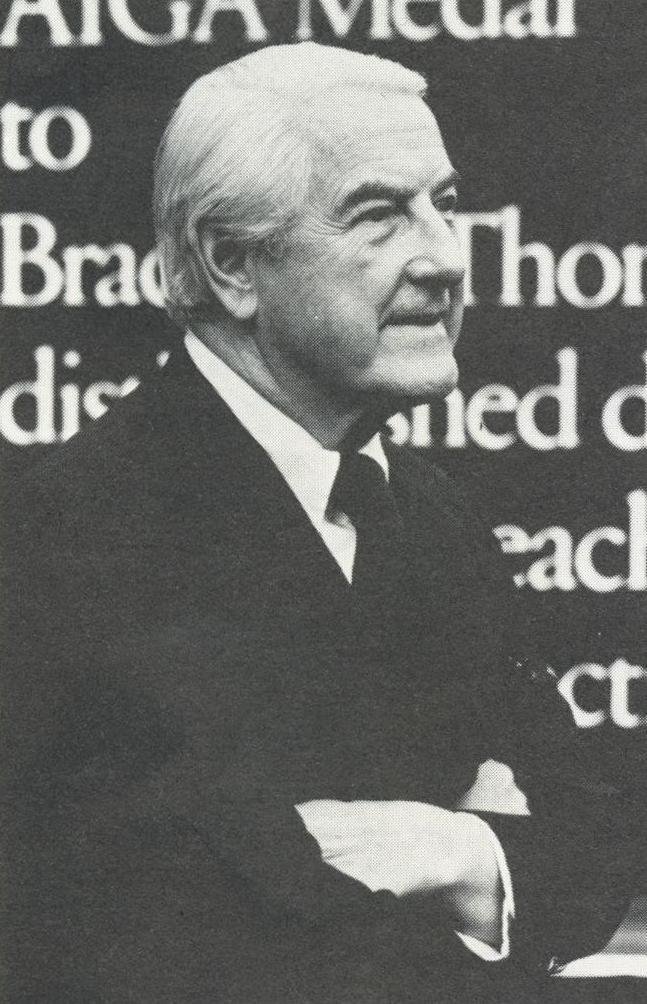
- Thompson circa 1983
- Born: James Bradbury Thompson; March 25, 1911; Topeka, Kansas, U.S.
- Died: November 1, 1995 (aged 84); Greenwich, Connecticut, U.S.
- Occupation: Graphic designer

J. Bradbury Thompson (March 25, 1911 – November 1, 1995) was an American graphic designer and art director known for his work designing magazines, books, and postage stamps.

== Early life and education ==
James Bradbury Thompson was born on March 25, 1911, in Topeka, Kansas, and attended Topeka High School. He attended Washburn College, where he was a member of Alpha Delta Fraternity, the yearbook editor and designer. He graduated in 1934 with a degree in economics and a minor in art. A facility called the Bradbury Thompson Alumni Center now stands at Washburn. In 1938, Thompson designed the college's mascot, The Ichabod.

== Career ==
In 1938, he moved to New York City and designed the catalog for the 1939 World's Fair. During World War II, he worked in the publication's division of the Office of War Information (OWI) designing magazines including U.S.A., a magazine aimed at Americans and allies.

Later in 1938, Thompson began working with the arts journal of West Virginia Pulp and Paper Company, Westvaco Inspirations for Printers. The booklet was meant to showcase the company's papers and Thompson began experimenting with typography, photographic reproduction and color, drawing inspiration from printing elements and borrowing plates and separations from museums, magazines, and advertising agencies. These borrowed elements blended modern and traditional elements to become a leading avant-garde publication with a distribution of 35,000. By 1962, he had designed 61 issues. Thompson was art director of Mademoiselle magazine for fifteen years beginning in 1945. In c. 1948, Thompson designed the book Painting toward architecture for the Miller Company Collection of Abstract Art, which accompanied their multi-year art and architecture exhibition, also by this name, in over 25 venues across the United States. In total, Thompson designed 35 magazines, including Business Week, the Harvard Business Review, and Smithsonian magazine.

In 1969, he worked for the Citizens Stamp Advisory Committee as the design coordinator and designed more than 120 United States postage stamps in a wide range of subjects himself. He worked in this role until 1978, influencing the design of stamps. Thompson was believed to be the most prolific postage stamp designer in America.

A signature design from Thompson was his redesign of the King James Bible into the Washburn College Bible in 1979. The 1800-page three-volume Bible was a limited-edition with only 398 copies, taking 10 years to make. Thompson wanted the text to be more accessible and used the typeface Sabon set at 14-point in flush-left, ragged-right columns which allowed Thompson to break the text like a spoken cadence. This book was one of the first to use the typeface, designed by Jan Tschichold and released in 1967. His typographic alignment of the text broke the standard of flushed columns that the Gutenberg Bible set.

Thompson served on the faculty of Yale University from 1956 to 1995. He received the AIGA Gold Medal in 1975. He was inducted into the Art Directors Club Hall of Fame in 1977 and received the Type Director's Club Medal in 1986.

In 1988, his autobiography, "The Art of Graphic Design," was published by Yale University Press. It won the North America's George Wittenborn Memorial Award as best art book of the year from the Art Libraries Society.

== Alphabet 26 ==
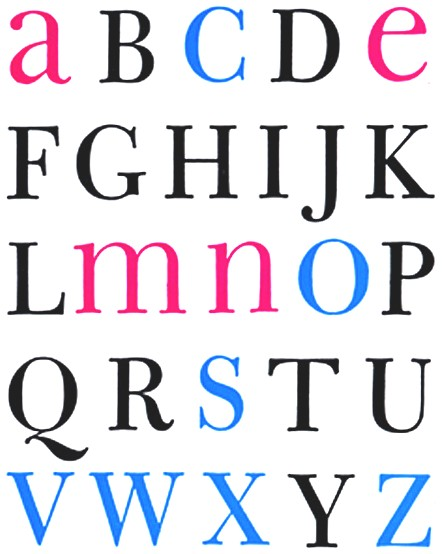
Alphabet 26. – red: lowercase letter forms used; black: uppercase letter forms used; blue: letters that share the same form in lowercase and uppercase in the basic Latin alphabet.

In 1950, Thompson developed a typeface called Alphabet 26 or a "monoalphabet," an alphabet whose uppercase and lowercase forms of each letter were identical, and case was expressed through letter size only. His monoalphabet was a transitional serif, modelled after Baskerville, with lowercase a, e, m, and n mixed with uppercase B, D, F, G, H, I, J, K, L, P, Q, R, T, U, and Y. (The forms of C/c, O/o, S/s, V/v, W/w, X/x and Z/z are essentially the same in uppercase and lowercase letters to begin with, as well as the forms of U/u with various sans-serif typefaces.) The simplification was intended to make the letters of the alphabet more logical and intuitive, making the alphabet easier to learn and use. Thompson first published the alphabet in a Westvaco Inspirations for Printers.

The set of letters for Alphabet 26 (normal and bold weights) is:

a b c d e f g h i j k l m n o p q r s t u v w x y z
a b c d e f g h i j k l m n o p q r s t u v w x y z

The following example uses the CSS rule font-variant-caps: unicase (for all lowercase letters only), which was not supported by many browsers as of July 2017:

BRaDBURY THomPson DesIGneD aLPHaBeT 26.

The following closer approximation, using the CSS rule font-variant-caps: small-caps (on specific lowercase letters), should work in most current browsers (but may suffer from slight variations in weight and height):

Bradbury Thompson designed alphabet 26.

== Death and legacy ==
Thompson died on November 1, 1995, in Greenwich, Connecticut. His papers are housed at the University of Illinois at Chicago and at the Yale University Library. Books from his personal collection were donated to the National Gallery of Art Library in 2000.

== Bibliography ==
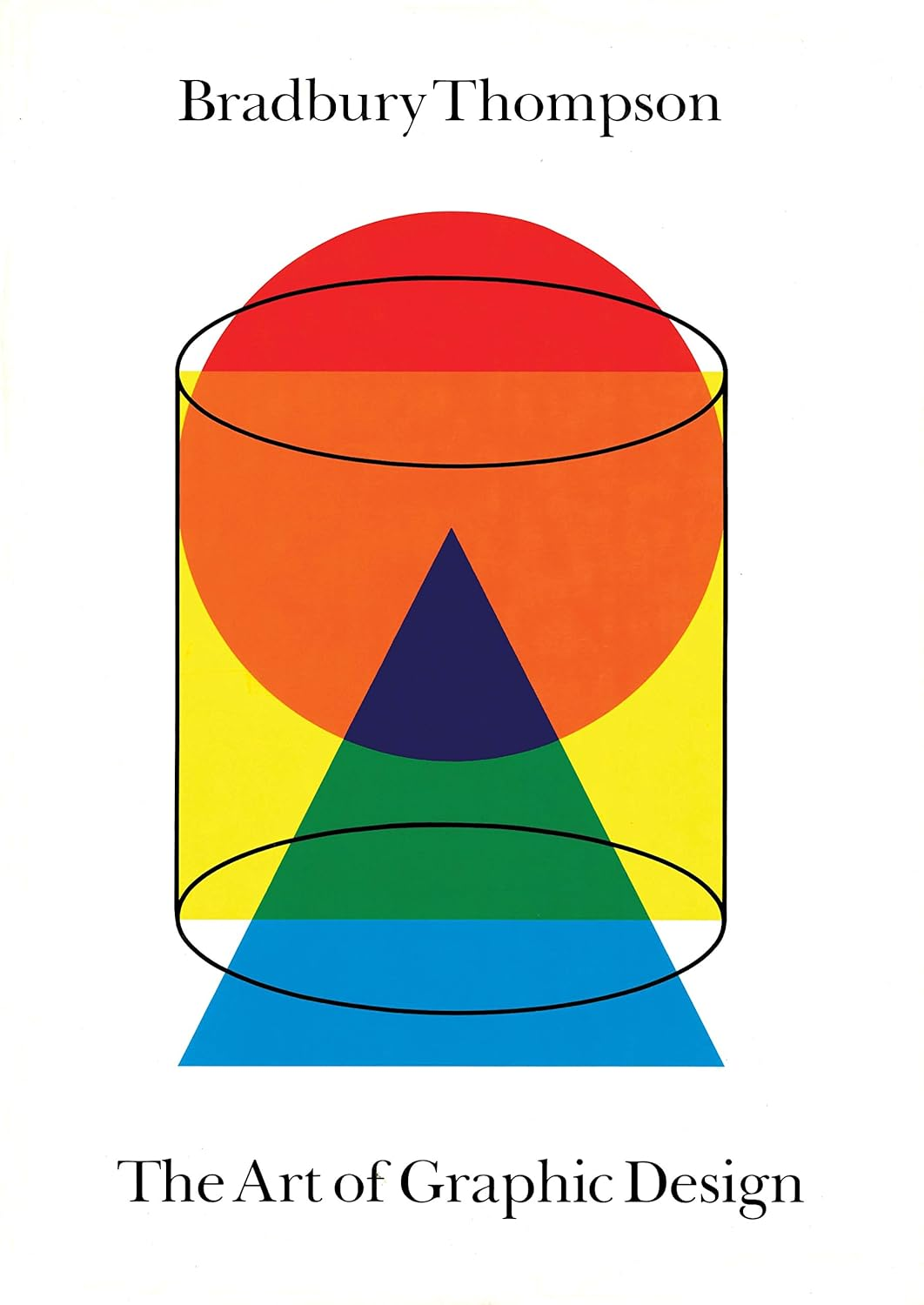
Bradbury Thompson, The Art of Graphic Design – 2018

- The Art of Graphic Design. With contributions by noteworthy designers, critics and art historians, Yale University Press, New Haven London 1988. (ISBN 978-0-300-23857-0)

== See also ==
- List of AIGA medalists
- Rusher's Patent Types
