= Aster (typeface) =

Serif typeface created in 1958

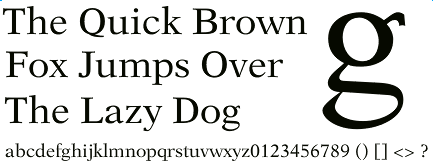
- Category: serif
- Classification: Modern
- Designers: Francesco Simoncini, published by Mecanorma
- Foundry: Simoncini SA
- Date created: 1958
- Also known as: New Aster, MN Aster

The Aster typeface, which originated in Italy, was designed in 1958 by Francesco Simoncini for Simoncini SA to be used in newspapers and books. This typeface is fairly wide with detailed, delicate serifs; it also has short ascenders and descenders for economy of space. The New Aster font family offers a few distinguishing marks, like the spurs of capitals A, N, V and W.
