= Microgramma (typeface) =

Geometric sans-serif typeface

- Category: Sans-serif
- Designers: Aldo Novarese; Alessandro Butti
- Foundry: Nebiolo
- Date released: 1952
- Re-issuing foundries: Linotype; URW
- Variations: Eurostile (Normal & Condensed variant); Independently Gothic

Microgramma is a sans-serif typeface designed by Aldo Novarese and Alessandro Butti for the Nebiolo Type Foundry in 1952. It became popular for use with technical illustrations in the 1960s, and was a favourite of graphic designers by the early 1970s.

Its uses range from publicity and publication design to packaging, largely because of its availability as a Letraset typeface. Early typesetters (like the AM Varityper) also incorporated it. Novarese later developed Eurostile in 1962, a successor to Microgramma that added lowercase letters, a bold condensed variant, and an ultra narrow design he called Eurostile Compact.

== Design ==
Microgramma is a wide, geometric, font with superellipse curves, designed by Aldo Novarese and Alessandro Butti in 1952. It was originally designed as a titling font with only uppercase letters. It was popularized by its availability as a Letraset typeface.

Later versions by Linotype and URW added a lowercase set, making it similarly in use to Eurostile. These new digital versions also expanded the character set to include accented Latin characters, mathematical symbols, and Latin ligatures. In the URW version, there are also extended Latin, subscripts and superscripts, and extended Latin ligatures.

In 1962, Novarese designed a spiritual successor titled Eurostile, a similar font with a lowercase set that further popularized the style and versatility.

=== Microgramma OnlyShadow ===
Microgramma OnlyShadow is a variant of Microgramma Bold that contains only the shadows of Microgramma Extended Bold, designed by URW Studio in 1994. Although Alessandro Butti died in 1959, URW credited him as the designer of the new font.

The Euro sign in the font has a different weight, styled from a different font family, and is not shadowed.

== Applications ==
Science fiction films and television series began using the typeface in the 60s and 70s, and this style later became associated with science fiction of this era.

=== Films ===
Microgramma was used both as titles and in production props in films such as Cool Hand Luke, THX 1138, Back to the Future, Apollo 13, and The Incredibles.

==== Alien ====
Microgramma and its related variations are used throughout the original Alien films, as well as the more recent reincarnations. Weyland-Yutani, the primary corporate conglomerate within both the earlier and recent Alien films (including the Alien vs. Predator crossover films), features use of Microgramma and its Bold Extended typeface in its corporate logo, although not exclusively.

==== Star Trek ====
Microgramma Bold Extended was used extensively in the Star Trek universe, such as Franz Joseph's The Star Trek Star Fleet Technical Manual. The font, in both its original and various altered forms, was incorporated into numerous displays and on ship exteriors in six of the Star Trek films, as well as depictions of "earlier technology" display screens, particularly for the Enterprise "prequel" series, during the four later television series. A modified version of Microgramma Bold Extended (sometimes called Starfleet Bold Extended) was used for the main hull registry number for Starfleet ships beginning with Star Trek: The Motion Picture in 1979. Some characters were modified, and all characters have red piping outlining them.

=== Television ===
In television, Microgramma has been used for various news programs like NBC News, SportsCenter, and HTV, as well as shows, such as The Inspector, Star Trek, 'Way Out. It was notably used in many of Gerry Anderson's shows Thunderbirds, Captain Scarlet and the Mysterons, Joe 90, Space: 1999, and UFO.

It was the source of the TV Globo logo from the late 1960s until 1976.

=== Other ===
Microgramma, and sometimes its spiritual successor Eurostile, is used for corporate logos, such as Toshiba, Casio, Halliburton, and IMAX. It is also used in album covers for Muzak, The Human League, The Police, Radiohead, Tame Impala and Eminem. Automobile manufacturers like Chrysler, General Motors, Honda and Nissan, especially in the 1980s and 1990s, used Microgramma for interior gauges. It was also a popular choice for electronics and keyboards, such as the TRS-80 Color Computer, VIC-20 keyboard, and the Moog Prodigy. Public transportation also made use of Microgramma, for the Penn Central railroad wordmark. The Shabolovskaya metro station displayed "ШАБОЛОВСКАЯ" in a Cyrillic version of Microgramma. In video games, it has been used in Doom 3, Ratchet & Clank: Up Your Arsenal, StarCraft, Grand Theft Auto 2, and Homeworld.

Microgramma is the font of several NASCAR numbers used by Richard Childress Racing and Dale Earnhardt, Inc., such as the #8 (mainly driven by Dale Earnhardt Jr. until 2007), #3 (Dale Earnhardt and Austin Dillon) and #29 (Kevin Harvick). Red Bull Racing also used the font for their driver numbers in Formula 1 from 2016 to 2025.
