= Jakob Erbar =

- Born: 8 February 1878; Düsseldorf, Germany
- Died: 7 January 1935 (aged 56); Cologne, Germany
- Known for: typography
- Notable work: Erbar series

Jakob Erbar (8 February 1878 – 7 January 1935) was a German professor of graphic design and a type designer. Erbar trained as a typesetter for the Dumont-Schauberg Printing Works before studying under Fritz Helmut Ehmcke and Anna Simons. Erbar went on to teach in 1908 at the Städtischen Berufsschule and from 1919 to his death at the Kölner Werkschule. His seminal Erbar series was one of the first geometric sans-serif typefaces, predating both Paul Renner's Futura and Rudolf Koch's Kabel by some five years.

== Typefaces ==
Exemplar of some of the fonts designed by Jakob Erbar.

Foundry types produced by Jakob Erbar:

- Feder Grotesk (1910, Ludwig & Mayer Typefoundry) - a "stressed" sans-serif, with some strokes very visibly thicker than others, suggesting Art-Nouveau style lettering or writing with a broad-nibbed pen. Feder means "feather" or "quill pen" in German
- Erbar series (1922–30, Ludwig & Mayer Typefoundry) - a large sans-serif font family; many weights and styles released.
  - Erbar-Grotesk, made in four weights with italic and condensed.
  - Lumina, an open face version.
  - Lux, a version with contrasting outlines.
  - Phosphor, a bold, in-line version.
  - Lucina, a set of white-on-black capitals.
- Koloss (1923, Ludwig & Mayer Typefoundry) - an ultra-bold design similar to Feder-Grotesk
- Candida (1936, Ludwig & Mayer Typefoundry) - a decorative geometric serif typeface
