= Raffaello Bertieri =

Italian artist

- Born: 5 January 1875; Florence, Italy
- Died: 30 May 1941 (aged 66); Florence, Italy
- Known for: typography
- Notable work: Inkunabula

Raffaello Bertieri (1875–1941) was a publisher, graphic designer, and type designer from Florence, Italy. Bertieri began working as a printer's apprentice in 1886 and by 1902 was an editor in Milan. He began publishing Il Risorgimento Grafico (Renaissance of the Graphic Arts) even before founding his own printing and publishing house, Bertieri & Vanesetti, which gained notoriety by publishing the works of Gabriele d'Annunzio, and renowned for its edition of L'arte di G B Bodoni. Many of his books won prizes, most notably at the hugely influential Paris Exposition of 1925.

== Fonts Designed by Raffaello Bertieri ==
All fonts cast by the Nebiolo type foundry.

- Inkunabula (1921), based on a Roman of Erhard Ratdolt.
- Sinibaldi (1926)
- Paganini (1928), designed by Alessandro Butti under Bertieri's direction.
- Iliade (1930)
- Ruano (1933)
