= Simoncini =

Simoncini is an Italian-language surname. Notable people with the surname include:

- Aldo Junior Simoncini (born 1986), Sammarinese footballer
- Anita Simoncini (born 1999), Sammarinese singer
- Davide Simoncini (born 1986), Sammarinese footballer
- Francesco Simoncini (died 1967), Italian type designer and founder of Simoncini SA
- Francesco Simoncini (born 2006), Italian singer and activist
- Giacomo Simoncini (born 1994), Sammarinese politician, sports executive and pharmacist
- Matt Simoncini, chief executive officer and president of Lear Corporation from 2011
- Salvatore Simoncini, 19th century Italian painter
- Samuele Simoncini (born 1984), Italian tenor
- Tullio Simoncini (born 1951), alternative cancer treatment advocate
- Valeria Simoncini (born 1966), Italian mathematician
