= Ludwig & Mayer =

Defunct German type foundry

Schriftgießerei Ludwig & Mayer
- Type: Defunct
- Industry: Type foundry
- Founded: 1875
- Founder: Carl Jacob Ludwig
- Defunct: 1984
- Headquarters: Germany
- Key people: Karlgeorg Hoefer, Jakob Erbar, Helmut Matheis

Ludwig & Mayer was a German type foundry in Frankfurt am Main, Germany. Many important designers worked for the Ludwig & Mayer type foundry, including Heinrich Jost, Karlgeorg Hoefer, Helmut Matheis, and most notably Jakob Erbar, whose Erbar Book was one of the first geometric sans-serif typefaces, predating both Paul Renner's Futura and Rudolf Koch's Kabel by some five years. Starting in 1925, Ludwig & Mayer types were distributed in the United States by Continental Type Founders Association. When the foundry ceased operations in 1984, rights to the typefaces was transmitted to the Neufville Typefoundry.

== Typefaces ==
These foundry types were produced by Ludwig & Mayer:

=== House Faces ===
- Allemannia Fraktur (1908), later digitized by Mew Varissara Ophaswongse (2018)
- Allright (1936)
- Altenburger Gotisch (1928)
- Bastard Mediaeval
- Beatrice (1931)
- Behrens
- Chic
- Cochin (1922)
- Commerciale
- Die Mode (1914-1915)
- Diplomat (1964), later digitized as Diploma by Hans van Maanen (2009)
- Excelsior (1914), a script face
- Firmin Didot (1929), a version Didot.
- Hallo (1956)
- Kombinette (1932)
- Kupferplatte (1950)
- Largo (1939)
- Luminous
- Magnet (1951)
- Manolo, an art nouveau faced revived by Ralph Unger as RMU Manolo (2019)
- Nelson (1902), an art nouveau face.
- Samson Script
- Wren

=== Designer Faces ===
- Achtung (1932, Erhard Grundeis), a heavy script face.
- Aeterna (1927, Heinrich Jost), also known as Jost Mediaeval and offered for machine composition by Intertype (Berlin).
- Allegro (1936, Hans Bohn)
- Altenburger Gotisch (1928, Hans Wagner), a fraktur face.
- Antiqua die Schlanke (1938/9, Walter Höhnisch)
- Augenheil (1908, Richard Ludwig)
- Big Band (1974, Karlgeorg Hoefer)
- Brigitte (1935, Albert Christoph Auspurg)
- Candida (1936, Jakob Erbar), offered for machine composition by Linotype (Frankfurt).
  - Candida Italic (1937, Walter Höhnisch)
- Charleston (1967, Hace Frey), an updating of a Victorian display face.
- Charme (1957/8, Helmut Matheis), a calligraphic face.
  - Slogan (1959, Helmut Matheis), a bold version of Charme, not to be confused with the Nebiolo type foundry’s face of the same name.
- Colonia (1938/9, Walter Ferdinand Kemper) an early humanist sans.
- Compliment (1965, Helmut Matheis), an angular vertical script.
- Contact (1968, Imre Reiner), not to be confused with the American Type Founders face of the same name.
- Dominante (1959, Johannes Schweitzer), offered for machine composition by Simoncini SA (1962) .
- Domino (1959, Alfred Riedel), a fat face.
- Dynamo (1930, K. Sommer)
  - Motor (typeface) (1930, K. Sommer), an engraved version of Dynamo.
- Elegance (1968, Karlgeorg Hoefer)
- Erbar-Grotesk (1922-30, Jakob Erbar), many faces in this series were also offered for machine composition by Linotype.
  - Lucina ( Jakob Erbar), a reverse version of Erbar.
  - Lumina ( Jakob Erbar), an outline version of Erbar.
  - Lux (Jakob Erbar), an engraved inline version of Erbar
  - Phosphor (Jakob Erbar), an inline version of Erbar.
- Express (1952, Walter Höhnisch), a script face.
- Feder Grotesk + Fett Feder Grotesk + Feder Italic (1910, Jakob Erbar)
- Germroth-Deutsch (1935, G. Germroth), a blackletter face.
- Headline (1964, Karlgeorg Hoefer)
- Hoelderlin (1937/8, Eugen Weiss), blackletter face.
- Koloss (1923, Jakob Erbar)
- Kombi (1930, Karl Hermann Schaefer)
- Krimhilde (1934, Albert Christoph Auspurg)
- Lyrisch (1907, Georg Schiller)
- Matheis Mobil (1960, Helmut Matheis), a formal script.
- Mona Lisa (1930, Albert Christoph Auspurg)
- National (Fraktur) (1933/4, Walter Höhnisch)
- Prägefest (1926, Paul Eduard Lautenbach)
- Primadonna (1956, Helmut Matheis), a formal script.
- Professor-Krause-Fraktur (1930, Wilhelm Krause), a blackletter.
- Rasse (1924, Albert Christoph Auspurg)
- Reichert-Gotisch (1930’s, Joshua Reichert)
- Rhapsodie (1949-51, Ilse Schüle), a modern romanization of a Schwabacher blackletter.
- Schlanke + Bold + Semibold (1939, Walter Höhnisch), known outside Germany as Slender.
- Schräge National (1933/4, Walter Höhnisch)
- Skizze (1935, Walter Höhnisch), a script face also known as Sketch.
- Stereo (1968, Karlgeorg Hoefer)
- Stop (1939, Walter Höhnisch), a dry-brush script face.
- Symphonie (1945, Imre Reiner), a highly flourished script sold outside of Germany as Stradivarius.
- Welt (1931, Hans Wagner), a slab serif made in at least five weights. Also known as Luxor, Landi (1939-43 Nebiolo Foundry with additional variations by Alessandro Butti and Aldo Novarese)), Ramses (Fonderie Typographique Française), and Atlas (Amsterdam Type foundry), it was also offered for machine composition by Linotype.
- Welt-Fraktur (1910, Lorenz Reinhard Spitzenpfeil)
- Werbekraft (1926, Arthur Schulze)
- Werk-Fraktur (1918, Lorenz Reinhard Spitzenpfeil)
- Werbeschrift Deutsch (1933, Walter Höhnisch)
- Wolfram (1930, Hans Wagner), a heavy upright italic.

=== Licensed Faces ===
The following faces were originally faces cut for line-casting by Simoncini SA.

- Armstrong (1970, Francesco Simoncini)
- Aster or Aster Simoncini (1958, Francesco Simoncini), a newspaper font in several weights with matching italics.
- Life (1965, Francesco Simoncini), a newspaper and book font in several weights with matching italics.
- Permanent (1962, Karlgeorg Hoefer) a display font made in at least six weights.
- Simoncini Garamond (1958-61, Francesco Simoncini + W. Bilz), a recutting of Garamond.
