= Josefa Amar y Borbón =

Josefa Amar y Borbón (1749–1833) was a Spanish feminist writer of the Enlightenment period. She was part of the first generation of European feminists.

== Life ==
Amar was Aragonese by birth, born in 1749 in Saragossa. She was the fifth child of Jose Amar and Ignacia Borbon, a distinguished Aragonese couple. When she was five years old, her father became a court physician and family moved to Madrid, where she was educated. In Madrid, she was tutored by royal preceptors and had direct access to the king's libraries. This allowed her to acquire self-taught education with proficiency in the sciences, as well as in classical and modern European languages and literatures. In 1764, Amar married Joaquin Fuertes Piquer (died 1798), and they had at least one child, a son. They returned to Saragossa in 1772 when her husband, a judge, was appointed to the royal court. There, Amar was the first female member of the Aragonese Economic Society, which provided work for prison inmates and help for the poor, (1782), as well as a member of Ladies' Group, Madrid Economic Society (1787) and the Medical Society of Barcelona (1790). She was exclusively active from this period of 1782-1790.

== Translations ==
Amar was well versed in Greek, Latin, French, English and Italian. She was celebrated for her critical translations. Following her translation of Llampillas, she was admitted to the Aragonese Economic Society. She translated the multivolumes of Historical and Apologetic Essay of Spanish Literature by exiled Catalan Jesuit Javier Lampillas. She also translated discourse on whether parish priests should teach agricultural economy to local farmers, published in Zaragoza in 1783. In addition, her translation of Mme de Lambert was praised by Mme de Genlis.

== Writing ==
In the 1780s, she began publishing essays and treatises in three broad categories: science and medicine, study of letters and humanities, and combatting superstition. Amar published 8 essays between 1783 and 1787, and a book Discurso sobre la education fisica y moral de las mugeres (Discourse of the physical and moral education of women) in 1790. In addition, in 1786 she wrote a vindication of women’s rights, “Discourse in Defense of the Talent of Women, and of Their Aptitude for Governing and Other Positions in Which Men Are Employed”. Her writing also appeared in Memorial Literario. She is known for being witty and sarcastic in her writing.

== Legacy ==
Amar laid the groundwork for Enlightenment feminism, especially in her representation of feminine happiness. She believed that women had the right to happiness, and searched for ways women could achieve both personal and collective happiness. She challenged traditional values based on Catholic dogma, although she remained a devout Catholic all of her life, and was a proponent of applying common Enlightenment ideas of just government (following Locke, Montesquieu and Rousseau) to the situation of women. Amar is one of a few enlightened women who are associated with the reign of Carlos III. She has been called the most erudite Spanish woman of her time, she was an active civil rights leader who defended the rights of women to equal education and equal participation in public life. In her written work, Amar combined the established traditions of the Siglo de Oro (Golden Age) writing with 18th century themes to begin defining a literary style that was later recognized as the modern essay.

== See also ==
- Inés Joyes y Blake, 18th-century Spanish writer, novelist, and translator
- Margarita Hickey, 18th-century Spanish poet, translator, and geographer
