= Karlgeorg Hoefer =

German calligrapher and typographer

- Born: February 6, 1914. Schlesisch-Drehnow (now Drzonów) in Silesia
- Died: October 8, 2000 (aged 86)
- Occupations: Calligrapher and typographer
- Notable work: FE-Schrift

Karlgeorg Hoefer (6 February 1914 – 8 October 2000) was a German calligrapher and typographer.

Hoefer was born in Schlesisch-Drehnow (now Drzonów) in Silesia. He taught typography at the Hochschule für Gestaltung Offenbach (until 1970 "Werkkunstschule Offenbach") and held several calligraphy workshops for calligraphic societies in Los Angeles, San Francisco, Portland, Boston, Minneapolis-St. Paul, Portland and Washington. In 1987, he founded the Schreibwerkstatt-Klingspor Offenbach and supported the Klingspor Museum in Offenbach am Main.

He designed fonts for Linotype, Klingspor, and Ludwig & Mayer, including the Permanent family and Permanent Headline.

Today, his most commonly seen font is the FE-Schrift, the standard font for German number plates.

He died in Offenbach in 2000.
