= The History of Rasselas, Prince of Abissinia =

1759 short fable by Samuel Johnson

Rasselas Prince of Abissinia
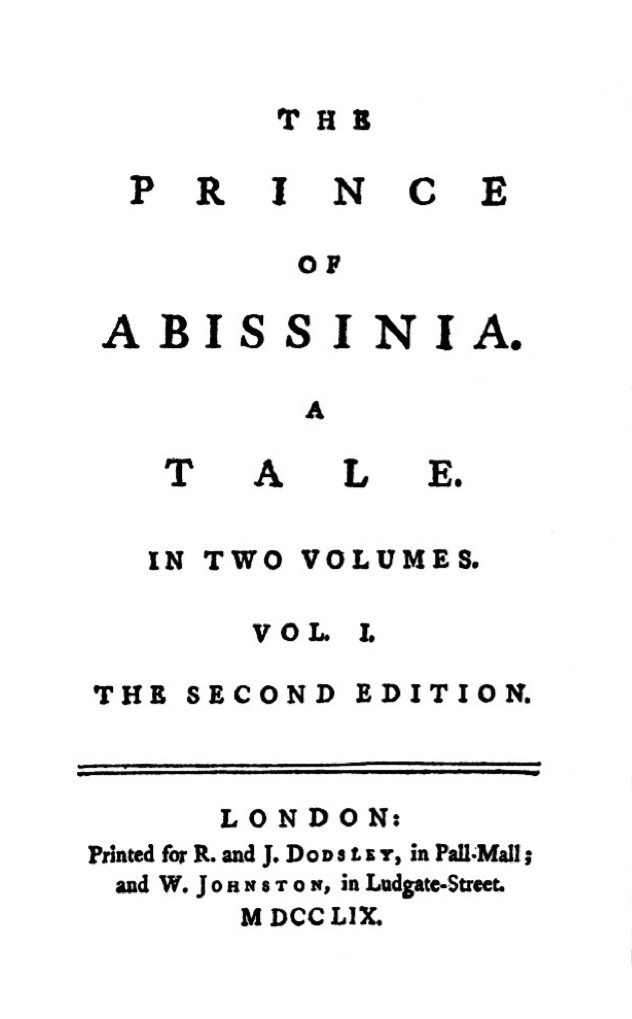
- Cover of corrected Second Edition of 1759
- Author: Samuel Johnson
- Original title: The Prince of Abissinia: A Tale
- Language: English
- Genre: Apologue, Theodicy, Fable
- Publisher: R. and J. Dodsley, W. Johnston
- Publication date: April 1759
- Publication place: United Kingdom
- Media type: Print

The History of Rasselas, Prince of Abissinia, originally titled The Prince of Abissinia: A Tale, though often abbreviated to Rasselas, is an allegory about bliss and ignorance by Samuel Johnson. The book's original working title was "The Choice of Life". The book was first published in April 1759 in England. Early readers considered Rasselas to be a work of philosophical and practical importance and critics often remark on the difficulty of classifying it as a novel.

== Origin and influences ==
At the age of fifty, Johnson wrote the piece in only one week to help pay the costs of his mother's funeral, intending to complete it on 22 January 1759 (the eve of his mother's death). Johnson is believed to have received a total of £75 for the copyright. Though this is still popular belief, Wharton and Mayerson's book, "Samuel Johnson and the Theme of Hope," explains how James Boswell, the author of Johnson's biography, was "entirely wrong in supposing that Rasselas was written soon after his mother's death". He states that it wasn't a way of "defraying" the expenses of the funeral. In fact, Johnson wrote Rasselas instead of going to see his mother while she was still alive. It was written in anticipation of her funeral. Edward Tomarken writes in his book, Johnson, Rasselas, and the Choice of Criticism, that this belief was not questioned until 1927 as "...the tradition of the gloomy, funereal tone of the choice of life motif in Rasselas remained unopposed: the question of whether or not the genesis of Rasselas involved a literal funeral was not considered important. Moreover, the assumption of a gloomy genesis served to keep religion in the background, for any theological difficulty could be attributed to the fact that the author was mourning the death of his mother".

Following in the footsteps of Voltaire's Zadig and Montesquieu's Persian Letters, Johnson was influenced by the vogue for exotic locations including Ethiopia. He had translated A Voyage to Abyssinia by Jerónimo Lobo in 1735 and used it as the basis for his "philosophical romance". Ten years before he wrote Rasselas he published The Vanity of Human Wishes in which he describes the inevitable defeat of worldly ambition.

This idea of a prince condemned to a happy imprisonment has resonance – Johnson himself was probably ignorant of it – in the legend of Buddha, though it would have reached him through the story of Barlaam and Josaphat, adopted as the subject of one of Lope de Vega's comedies: the idea of a prince who has been brought up surrounded with artificial happiness.

— Jorge Luis Borges

Although many have argued that the book Rasselas had nothing to do with Abyssinia, and that Samuel Johnson chose Abyssinia as a locale for no other reason than wanting to write an anti-orientalist fantasy, some have begun to argue that the book has a deep tie to Ethiopian thought due to Johnson's translation of A Voyage to Abyssinia and his lifelong interest in its Christianity. Other scholars have argued that Johnson was influenced, at least in part, by other texts, including works by Herodotus and Paradise Lost, both of which describe Ethiopia and its ancient practice of interning princes in Mount Amora (Amba Geshen).

According to Wendy L. Belcher, when Johnson sent his manuscript to the publisher he titled the work "The History of – - – - Prince of Abissinia," which suggests that he had still not decided on the name of his protagonist. It is Belcher's argument that "Johnson coined the name 'Rasselas' for its symbolic meaning, not its phonetic relation to the Catholic prince Ras Sela Christos. Since ras means 'prince' and sela means 'portrait', Johnson may have invented the term 'portrait of a prince' as an evocative name for his main character."

== Content ==
Rasselas, the fourth son of the King of Abyssinia (modern-day Ethiopia), is shut up in a beautiful valley called The Happy Valley, "till the order of succession should call him to the throne". Rasselas enlists the help of an artist who is also known as an engineer to help with his escape from the Valley by plunging out through the air, though they are unsuccessful in this attempt. Rasselas grows weary of the factitious entertainments of the place and, after much brooding, escapes with his sister Nekayah, her attendant Pekuah and his poet-friend Imlac by digging under the wall of the valley. They are to see the world and search for happiness in places such as Cairo and Suez. After a sojourn in Egypt, where they encounter various classes of society and undergo a few adventures, they perceive the futility of their search and return to Abyssinia after none of their hopes for happiness are achieved.

The story is primarily episodic. According to Borges, "Johnson wrote this book in such a slow, musical style ... in which all the sentences are perfectly balanced. There is not a single sentence that ends abruptly, and we find a monotonous, but very agile, music, and this is what Johnson wrote while he was thinking about the death of his mother, whom he loved so much".

=== Character list ===
- Rasselas – son of the King of Abyssinia;
- Imlac – a philosopher, son of a merchant, who has come to the Happy Valley only to find that life there is empty;
- Nekayah – sister and travelling companion of Rasselas;
- Pekuah – Nekayah's attendant;
- The Hermit – One of the first men Rasselas meets on his journey. Discourages him from a life of solitude;
- The Master – One of Rasselas's teachers, he learns of Rasselas's discontent and tries to encourage him to be content in the valley of Happiness;
- The Bassa – The highest title of honour in the Ottoman Empire. The Bassa does little to help his subjects;
- The Engineer – Rasselas is intrigued by this man's mechanical understanding and observes his attempt to create a flying contraption. However, he ultimately fails;
- The Astronomer – A learned man that lives in solitude. He confesses to Imlac that he believes he can control the weather. Later he comes back to his sense after a visit of Pekuah and Nekayah.

== Critical interpretations ==
Irvin Ehrenpreis sees an aged Johnson reflecting on lost youth in the character of Rasselas, who is exiled from Happy Valley. Rasselas has also been viewed as a reflection of Johnson's melancholia projected on to the wider world, particularly at the time of his mother's death. And some have interpreted the work as an expression of Johnson's Christian beliefs, arguing that the work expresses the impossibility of finding happiness in life on earth, and asks the reader to look to God for ultimate satisfaction. Hester Piozzi saw in part Johnson in the character of Imlac, who is rejected in his courtship by a class-conscious social superior. Thomas Keymer sees beyond the conventional roman à clef interpretations to call it a work that reflects the wider geo-political world in the year of publication (1759): the year in which "Britain became master of the world". Rasselas is seen to express hostility to the rising imperialism of his day and to reject stereotypical "orientalist" viewpoints that justified colonialism. Johnson himself was regarded as a prophet who opposed imperialism, who described the Anglo-French dispute for rule in North America as a dispute between two thieves over the proceeds of a robbery.

=== Orientalist interpretations ===
According to academic Abdulhafeth Ali Khrisat, Johnson follows a tradition of "academic studies of orientalism in the 18th century... west of the oriental studies which mainly focused on the Turkish language, culture, institutions and Islam." This tradition of study shows up in Rasselas through the use of Imlac, who has traveled to the West and seen its advancements. This led to philosophical comparison between the West and the East in the story. Through this, Johnson implies that the West is superior to the East, using Imlac as a mouthpiece. This negative portrayal of the East is done in the beginning of the story with the description of the Happy Valley. This description details how this place is meant to be a paradise or utopia, but also alluded to the idea of a prison. This setting, coupled with the western idea of happiness seen in Rasselas, brings out a portrayal of Arab and Muslim culture as being oppressive. According to Khrisat, this is a result of Johnson's portrayal of the east using European ideas.

=== Comparison to Candide ===
While the story is thematically similar to Candide by Voltaire, also published early in 1759 – both concern young men travelling in the company of honoured teachers, encountering and examining human suffering in an attempt to determine the root of happiness – their root concerns are distinctly different. Voltaire was very directly satirising the widely read philosophical work by Gottfried Leibniz, particularly the Théodicée, in which Leibniz asserts that the world, no matter how we may perceive it, is necessarily the "best of all possible worlds". In contrast the question Rasselas confronts most directly is whether or not humanity is essentially capable of attaining happiness. Rasselas questions his choices in life and what new choices to make in order to achieve this happiness. Writing as a devout Christian, Johnson makes through his characters no blanket attacks on the viability of a religious response to this question, as Voltaire does, and while the story is in places light and humorous, it is not a piece of satire, as is Candide.

Borges thought Candide "a much more brilliant book" than Rasselas, yet the latter was more convincing in its rejection of human happiness:

A world in which Candide – which is a delicious work, full of jokes – exists can't be such a terrible world. Because surely, when Voltaire wrote Candide, he didn't feel the world was so terrible. He was expounding a thesis and was having a lot of fun doing so. On the contrary, in Johnson's Rasselas, we feel Johnson's melancholy. We feel that for him life is essentially horrible.

== Legacy ==
Johnson was a staunch opponent of slavery, revered by abolitionists, and Rasselas became a name adopted by emancipated slaves.

=== Editions ===
The first American edition was published in 1768. The title page of this edition carried a quotation, inserted by the publisher Robert Bell from La Rochefoucauld: "The labour or Exercise of the Body, freeth Man from the Pains of the Mind; and this constitutes the Happiness of the Poor".

It was used by Philip Rusher in 1804 as the text of choice for the first use of his unsuccessful, paper-saving Patent Type with no descenders.

A quarto illustrated edition was published in 1805 by William Miller with engravings by Abraham Raimbach (after pictures by Robert Smirke).

=== Continuations ===
Rasselas was a jumping-off point for at least two continuations by other authors:

- Dinarbas (1790) by Cornelia Knight;
- The Second Part of the History of Rasselas (1835) by Elizabeth Pope Whately, wife of Richard Whately.

=== Radio adaptation ===
A radio adaptation of Rasselas by Jonathan Holloway was broadcast by BBC Radio 4 on 24 May 2015, with Ashley Zhangazha as Rasselas, Jeff Rawle as Samuel Johnson and Lucian Msamati as the poet Imlac. Cynthia Erivo made her BBC radio drama debut as Princess Nekayah. The drama was recorded at Dr Johnson's House, 17 Gough Square, in the City of London, where he wrote Rasselas in 1759. Sound design was by David Chilton, and the drama was introduced by Celine Luppo McDaid, Curator of Dr Johnson's House. It was produced and directed by Amber Barnfather.

==== Cast ====
- Samuel Johnson – Jeff Rawle
- Arthur Murphy – Kevin Trainor
- Housekeeper / Pekuah – Adjoa Andoh
- Princess Nekayah – Cynthia Erivo
- Prince Rasselas – Ashley Zhangazha
- Imlac – Lucian Msamati
- Aeronaut – Richard Cordery
- AJ – Gabriel Mokaké
- Ahmed – Amir El-Masry
- Mohammed / Intelligence Man – Zubin Varla

=== Cultural allusions ===
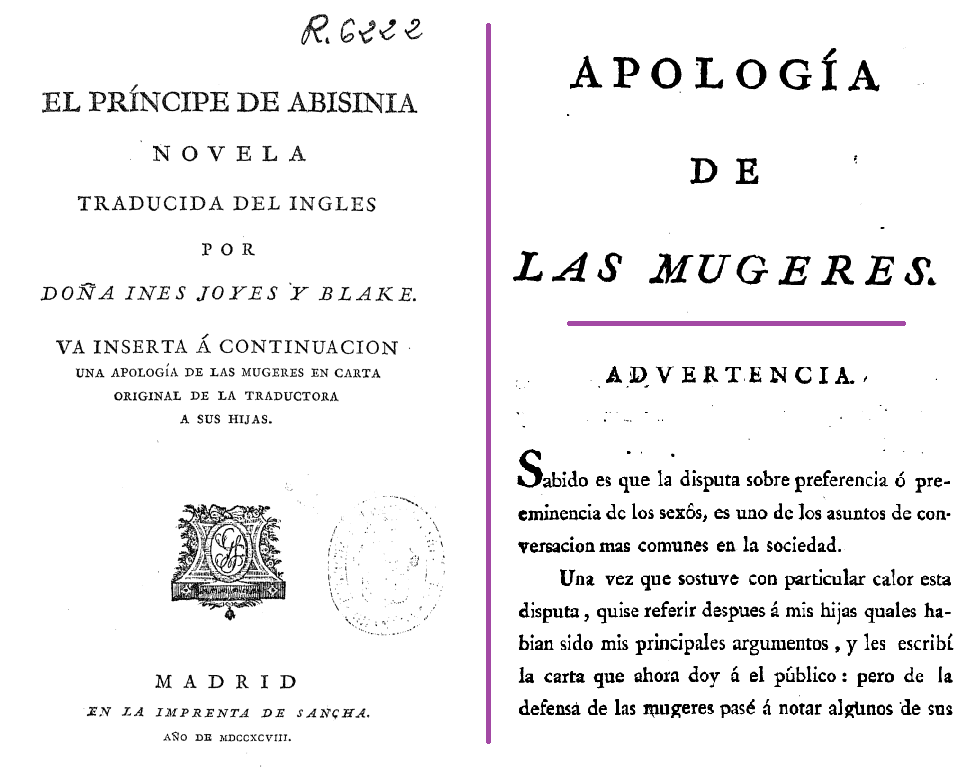
Inés Joyes y Blake translated The History of Rasselas, Prince of Abissinia (on left) and it included one of the first feminist essays in Spain (on the right)

Rasselas is mentioned numerous times in later notable literature:

- Mansfield Park (1814) by Jane Austen – Fanny Price refers to Dr. Johnson's celebrated judgment when she is comparing Mansfield Park and Portsmouth;
- Jane Eyre (1847) by Charlotte Brontë – Helen Burns reads it;
- Cranford (1851) by Elizabeth Gaskell – Captain Brown (who is reading The Pickwick Papers) denigrates Rasselas, thus offending Miss Jenkyns (who is a great admirer of Johnson);
- The House of the Seven Gables (1851) by Nathaniel Hawthorne – Rasselas is read by Hepzibah Pyncheon;
- The Mill on the Floss (1860) by George Eliot – Maggie reads it;
- Little Women (1868) by Louisa May Alcott – the book is dropped on the floor by Jo March as she talks to Mr Laurence about his Grandson Laurie's prank;
- Middlemarch (1871) by George Eliot – the book is enjoyed by Lydgate as a child, along with Gulliver's Travels, the dictionary, and the Bible;
- Rasselas was read by explorer Henry Stanley when he was a young man recently released from a Victorian workhouse, working as a school teacher in Wales. This is recorded in Tim Jeal's biography Stanley – The Impossible Life of Africa's Greatest Explorer;
- The Mountains of Rasselas by Thomas Pakenham – The title of Pakhenham's account of exploring Ethiopia to find the original royal mountaintop royal prisons alludes to Johnson's work. Pakenham explicitly mentions Johnson's work in this book;
- Sirak Heruy, son of Ethiopian intellectual Heruy Welde Sellase, translated Rasselas into Amharic, one of the major languages of Ethiopia. (Published in 1946/47);
- C.S. Lewis mentions Rasselas in a footnote to the second of his Riddell Memorial lectures on values and natural law, later published as The Abolition of Man: "Let us hope that Rasselas, chap. 22, gives the right picture of what [Dr. C.H. Waddington's] philosophy amounts to in action. ('The philosopher, supposing the rest vanquished, rose up and departed with the air of a man that had co-operated with the present system.')" – Retrieved from The Columbia University Augustine Club;
- Rasselas is mentioned significantly in two of Ursula Dubosarsky's novels – Zizzy Zing and Abyssinia;
- In The Book of Sequels by Henry Beard, Christopher Cerf, Sarah Durkee and Sean Kelly, "Wrassle-Ass" appears in a section called "Adult Sequels";
- The description of the Happy Valley is very similar to the poem "Kubla Khan" written by Samuel Taylor Coleridge about forty years later, in 1797, though not published until 1816;
- "Rasselas was too happy and went out to seek unhappiness." Line in Morning Mist, a short story by Japanese author Tatsuo Nagai (translated by Edward Seidensticker in ISBN 978-0804812269);
- Emily Dickinson names a bird Mr. Rasselas in a letter to Mary Bowles dated 10 December 1859 (L212);
- Marianne Moore's poem "The Frigate Pelican," first published in 1935, alludes to and quotes without attribution Chapter 6 of Johnson's book: "...there is a bird / that realizes Rasselas's friend's project / of wings uniting levity with strength" (1-3).

=== Locations ===
The community of Rasselas, Pennsylvania, located in Elk County, was named after Rasselas Wilcox Brown, whose father, Isaac Brown Jr., was fond of Johnson's story.

A Vale (or Valley) named after Rasselas is located in Tasmania within the Franklin-Gordon Wild Rivers National Park Latitude (DMS): 42° 34' 60 S Longitude (DMS): 146° 19' 60 E.

== See also ==
- Amba Geshen
- Orientalism
- James Ridley
- Wehni
