= FF Dax =

Humanist sans-serif typeface

- Category: Sans-serif
- Classification: Humanist
- Designer: Hans Reichel
- Foundry: FontFont
- Date released: 1995-1997

FF Dax is a humanist sans-serif typeface designed by Hans Reichel, published by FontFont library. The typeface is popular in advertising and in marketing. It is a "spurless" sans-serif, similar to typefaces like Semplicità and some characters in Gill Sans, where strokes end without terminals. This gives it a modernist, abstract feeling, detached from handwriting principles. Other designs, Barmeno and Sari, more bulbous cousins of FF Dax, have also been designed by Reichel.

In 2005, Hans Reichel reworked FF Dax into a cleaner, more mature text face called FF Daxline and FF Daxline Office Pro.

== Adoption ==
FF Dax is widely adopted in several advertising materials. It is also used as a branding font by a few organisations and companies.

The UPS Sans typeface, used in most of United Parcel Service branding since 2003, is a modified version of FF Dax. Wm Morrison, the British supermarket chain uses FF Dax on most in-store promotional material, hanging product location signs, and points of interest around the store – such as special offers and two-for-one deals.

The typeface was adopted by David Cameron in 2005 as part of the branding for his campaign for leadership of the UK Conservative Party. After Cameron was elected, the party was immediately rebranded in the style of the Cameron campaign, and Dax was used for a new version of the party logo and across all its subsequent advertising, leaflets and website, until being replaced by Lucida Sans in October 2006.

FF Dax is also used in the branding of the New Democratic Party of Canada, the Matterhorn Gotthard Bahn of Switzerland, the Workers' Party of Belgium and the Norwegian Progress Party.

FF Dax is also used by the New Scientist magazine as its main header text for their publications, banners and ads.

Banks in Canada (Bank of Montreal) and the Philippines (Bank of the Philippine Islands) use FF Dax for marketing and publications.

FF Dax is used on the brand identity of GSK acetaminophen brands Panadol and Calpol.

FF Dax is additionally used in the TV sitcom How I Met Your Mother for the title.

Air Malta adopted the typeface for their new logo.

Air Astana also used this font for their rebranded logo in 2015

Virgin Mobile also used the typeface for some parts of their logo.

Interpipe, Ukrainian pipe and railway wheel manufacturer, also used the typeface for parts of their logo and all communication materials.

Nubank, Brazilian startup credit card bank, also used it for part of their logo and whole typeface of their website, cards and advertising.

Turkish bank VakıfBank use FF Dax Medium Italic for their logo.

FF Dax is also the corporate typeface of Middlesex University and is used in its logo, in its publications and on its website.

FF Dax is also the corporate typeface of Finnish transportation company VR Group, and is used in its publications and on its website.

FF Dax was also used by argentine TV station Telefe and all its affiliates between 2001 and 2002 as the corporate font.

FF Dax has been used by Del Monte Philippines as product font packaging. It has also been used by Bank of the Philippine Islands from 2008 until 2018 when it changed its logo.

== See also ==
- Typography
- Font
- Ubuntu (typeface), a similar typeface to FF Dax
