= Eurostile =

Geometric sans-serif font

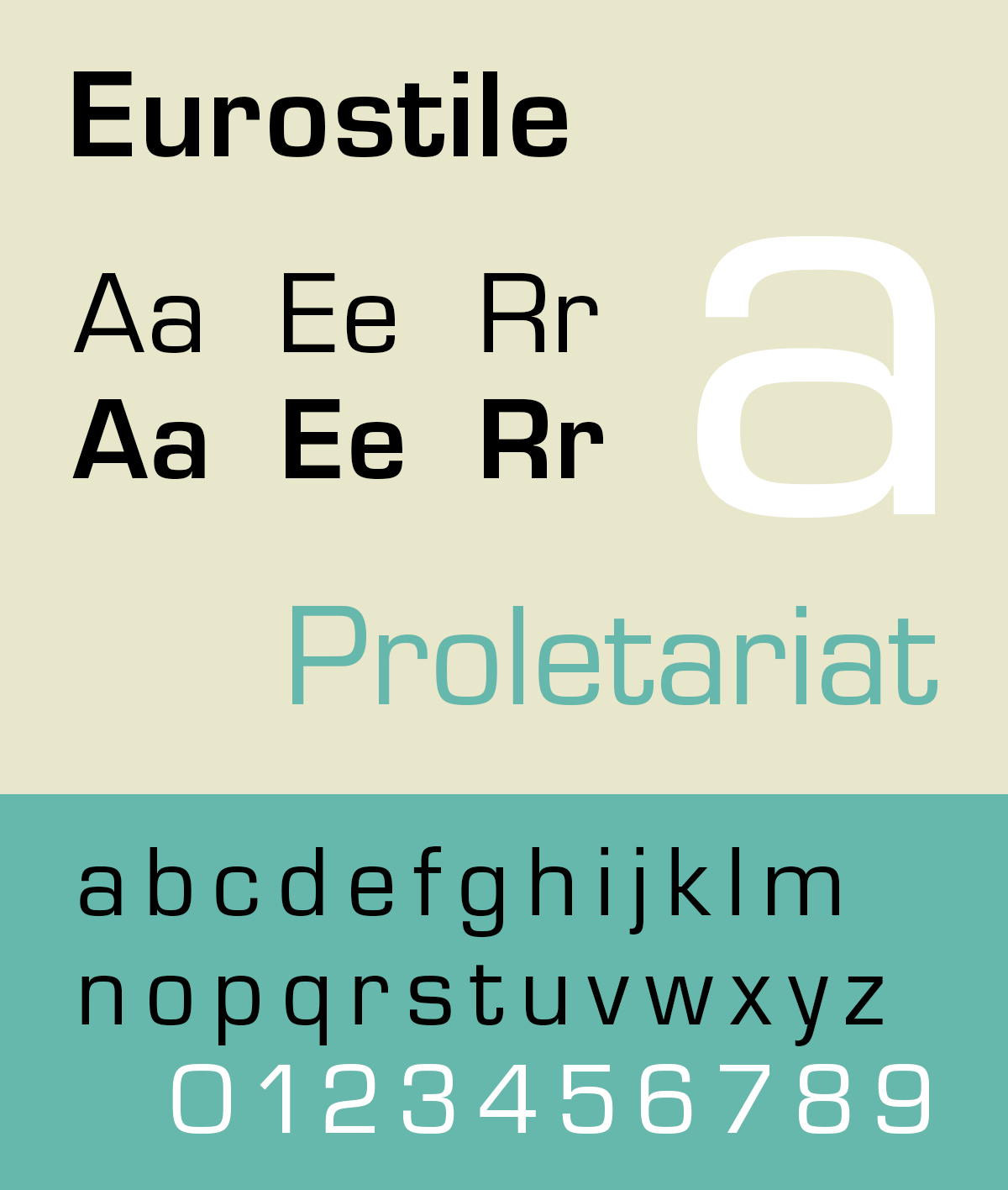
- Category: Sans-serif
- Classification: Geometric
- Designer: Aldo Novarese
- Foundry: Nebiolo
- Date released: 1962
- Re-issuing foundries: Linotype; URW; Monotype Imaging
- Design based on: Microgramma
- Variations: Eurostile Next; Eurostile Candy; Eurostile Unicase; Eurostile Relief; Eurostile Stencil; Square 721

Eurostile is a geometric sans-serif typeface designed by Aldo Novarese in 1962. Novarese created Eurostile for Nebiolo, an Italian foundry in Turin.

A decade after Novarese's involvement with Microgramma, a similar font with only uppercase letters in a variety of weights, Novarese designed Eurostile as a successor. Eurostile added lowercase letters, a bold condensed variant, and an ultra narrow design he called Eurostile Compact, for a total of seven fonts.

Like Microgramma, Eurostile is popular for headings and signs, especially in science fiction and media set in the 1960s and 70s. Its linear nature suggests modern architecture, with an appeal both technical and functional. The squarish superellipse shape evokes television screens from the 1950s and 1960s.

== Predecessor ==
Its predecessor, Microgramma was designed by Novarese and Alessandro Butti in 1952. It was released without a lowercase in five styles, including bold, extended, bold extended, condensed.

== Foundry type and cold type copies ==
Introduced by Nebiolo in 1962.

The popularity of Eurostile continued strong right into the cold type era, and it was offered by various manufacturers under the following names:

- Aldostyle — Autologic
- Eurogothic — Alphatype
- Eurostyle — Compugraphic
- Gamma — III
- Waltham — Star/Photon

== Digital era ==
=== Eurostile DisCaps ===
Eurostile DisCaps is a small caps version of the font. The family comes with one width in regular and bold weights, without obliques.

=== Eurostile LT ===
Eurostile LT is a variant of Eurostile by Linotype. It uses squarer designs for non-letter characters like integral, infinity, pilcrow; letterlike symbols like @, the copyright mark, the registration mark; and accents such as cedilla and the tilde. However, the circle in circled letters (@, Ω) remained circular, which was not fixed until Eurostile Next. The asterisk was redesigned to use six points instead of five. Some numerals, such as "1", were redesigned with a straight tail instead of an angled tail for use in Japan.

In all, the family includes 11 fonts, adding an Outline Bold font to the original Eurostile family by Linotype. It supports ISO Adobe 2, Adobe CE, and Latin extended character sets.

=== Eurostile Next (2008) ===
Eurostile Next is an optically rescaled and redesigned version of the original font family, designed by Linotype Type Director Akira Kobayashi. The redesign was based on the specimens of the original metal fonts.

Redesigned features include restoring the super curve lost in the previous film and digital versions, reduced stroke weight difference between the upper and lowercase letters, type-sensitive accents and letterlike symbols (ç, É, @, €). In addition, Kobayashi added new Light and Ultra Light weights to complement the Extended, Normal, and Condensed variations within the family, added small caps letters and figures.

The family consists of 15 fonts in 5 weights and 3 widths each. It supports ISO Adobe 2, Adobe CE, Latin extended character sets. OpenType features include small caps, tabular and proportional figures, superior and inferior numerals, diagonal fractions, and ordinals. Kobayashi decided not to provide italics.

==== Eurostile Candy (2008) ====
Eurostile Candy is a variant of Eurostile Next with rounded corners. Extra strokes in letters such as a, s, or t, are removed. Joints in letters such as n and r have been simplified to create even more square shapes.

The family consists of three weights (regular, semi bold, bold) in extended width, without oblique fonts. It supports ISO Adobe 2, Adobe CE, Latin extended character sets. Extra OpenType features found in Eurostile Next are not supported.

==== Eurostile Unicase (2008) ====
Eurostile Unicase is a variant of Eurostile Next with unicase letters. The family consists of one font (Regular) in extended width, without oblique fonts, but it has heavier weight than Eurostile Next Extended Bold. It supports ISO Adobe 2, Adobe CE, and Latin extended character sets. Extra OpenType features found in Eurostile Next are not supported.

Eurostile Unicase was used by MTV 00s (Prague and Europe) for its titles and overall branding.

=== Eurostile Relief ===
Eurostile Relief is a shadowed version of the font designed by URW Studio.

=== Eurostile Stencil ===
Eurostile Stencil is a stencil font based on URW's Eurostile black extended (D), designed by Achaz Reuss.

=== URW version ===
In the URW version, there are also Greek, Cyrillic, subscript and superscript, and box drawing characters. The family has 16 fonts in five weights and three widths, with condensed fonts on regular and heavy weights; extended fonts on regular and black weights; complementary oblique fonts on black, bold, heavy, heavy condensed, medium, regular, regular condensed.

== Similar fonts ==
Europe is a variant of Eurostile designed at TypeMarket in 1992–1993 by Alexey Kustov. The family includes 16 fonts, adding Shadow Demi, Shadow Oblique, and the missing oblique counterparts to the original Linotype family. It supports Cyrillic characters.

The Square 721 font from Bitstream is very nearly identical to Eurostile albeit with slightly different proportions. Square 721 is available in 2 weights and 3 widths each.

Michroma is a free and open source digital adaptation created by Vernon Adams, based on the extended variant of Eurostile and its predecessor Microgramma. Only one weight was released before Adams suffered injuries from a scooter accident in 2014 that were ultimately fatal in 2016.

== Applications ==
Type expert Dave Addey noted: "Indeed, Eurostile is such a quick way to establish a timeframe that whenever I see it in real life – which happens quite a lot in my adopted home of California – I assume I’ve been transported to some futuristic dystopia, where a local care center feels more like a sinister government facility for scientific experimentation."

=== Television ===
Eurostile is one of the most popular fonts in science-fiction television. Doctor Who has used the font for credits. Eurostile, or sometimes Microgramma, was used in the science fiction series UFO. It was also used for the title of television shows such as Star Trek, Ironside, Adam-12, and Star Trek: Enterprise. Eurostile is also featured in games on The Price Is Right, Deal or No Deal, as well as the logo for the Sunday night newsmagazine 60 Minutes. From 2004 until 2015 it was utilised in the subscript of the logo for the Eurovision Song Contest.

=== Video games ===
Eurostile can be found in several video games such as Homeworld, Ratchet and Clank, Ridge Racer, Tom Clancy's Ghost Recon, Tekken, Splinter Cell, Driv3r, Elite Dangerous, and the StarCraft series.

=== Film ===
Recreated videophone display from 2001: A Space Odyssey in Eurostile

Eurostile is used extensively in science fiction movies, among them 2001: A Space Odyssey (especially for HAL 9000) Jetsons: The Movie, Moon, Back to the Future, Starship Troopers, The Bourne Supremacy, The Andromeda Strain and Total Recall.

=== Logos ===
Eurostile is a corporate font for Toshiba, Dimension Films, and Diadora. It is also used as the logo font for GEICO, Nokia, New Flyer, Casio, Daihatsu, Halliburton and Roland Corporation JUNO.

=== Other ===
Eurostile is used on a series of Canadian dollar banknotes, on some Peugeot and Citroën vehicles, on Dell products, and on the flag for the state of Oklahoma.
