= Francisco Javier Lampillas =

Francisco Javier Lampillas or Xavier Llampillas, born as Francisco Javier Cerdá (1731–1810) was a Spanish Jesuit, scholar and author.

== Biography ==
Francisco Javier Lampillas was born in Mataró, Spain. He entered the Jesuit order in 1748. Following the expulsion of the Jesuits from the Spanish Empire in 1767, he was forced to flee to Italy. He became professor of theology in Ferrara. In Italy, he became involved in erudite, yet in retrospect petty, arguments about whether Spanish literature was a decadent, corrupting influence on Italian literature. His main writings were long tracts arguing mainly against the erudite Italian clerics and historians, Girolamo Tiraboschi and Saverio Bettinelli, who attributed any decline in Italian literature to corruption by Spanish influences. He published his six volumes of Saggio storico-apologetico della Letteratura Spagnola in Genoa, in 1778-1781. Both Tiraboschi and Bettinelli responded to Lampillas who, in turn, published their works along with his counter-response as the seventh volume of his essays (Rome, 1781). Lampillas's nationalistic stance was immediately popular in Spain and his work was soon translated into Spanish by Josefa de Amar y Borbón and published in Zaragoza, 1782-1789, with further commentaries, with the title Ensayo histórico-apologético de la literatura española contra las opiniones preocupadas de algunos escritores modernos italianos. Lampillas's work constitutes a well-reasoned, if rather polemical, defense of Spanish prose, poetry and theater, from Roman times to the Spanish Golden Age. Lampillas died in Sestri Levante, Italy.
