= Nebiolo Printech =

Italian printing press manufacturer and former type foundry

Fonderia Nebiolo
- Type: Public
- Industry: Graphic Arts
- Founded: Turin, Italy (1878)
- Founder: Giovanni Nebiolo
- Headquarters: Via Bologna 47, Turin, 10152, Italy
- Area served: Worldwide
- Key people: Giovanni Nebiolo, Raffaello Bertieri, Alessandro Butti, Aldo Novarese
- Products: Printing presses, paper, foundry type

The Fonderia Nebiolo was a manufacturer of printing presses and paper and formerly a type foundry. Nebiolo & Co. was created in 1878 when Giovanni Nebiolo bought out the type foundry of G. Narizzano in Turin, Italy, in 1852. In 1908, the company merged with the Urania Company and operated under the name Augustea and began to buy out many smaller foundries. In 1916, it was again renamed Società Nebiolo. In 1976, in occasion of the renovation of the Company that naturally would have come to an end that year, Fiat entered into the press manufacturing business and the Studio Artistico was closed up. In 1992, it became Nebiolo Printech S.p.A. and continues to manufacture presses under that name today.

== Type foundry ==
The Fonderia Nebiolo (Nebiolo Type Foundry) was part of a larger manufacturing organisation including:

- a Cast Iron Foundry employing 270 people and covering an area of about 18,400 square metres (198,000 sq ft), producing high quality meehanite castings, constantly controlled by a scientifically equipped laboratory. Its output fulfilled the requirements of Nebiolo press manufacture, besides supplying substantial quantities of castings to important Italian and foreign concerns;
- an Industrial Plant which employed 900 people and had a floor area of about 25,000 square metres (270,000 sq ft).

The Fonderia Nebiolo was originally founded in Turin in 1852 by a craftsman as a private concern, it was made into a Limited Company in 1880.

The reason why the Fonderia Nebiolo could be considered so unique is that in 1933 it was created, by Raffaello Bertieri, an internal Studio Artistico (Artistic Study) made of experts in type designing. It was run originally by Giulio Da Milano, then by Alessandro Butti and from 1952 by Aldo Novarese, the Italian most important type designer.

In the 60’s, while attempting to satisfy the changing of the print market, Fonderia Nebiolo established several different commercial collaborations: with Reber R41 as commercial partner in the distribution of its fonts as dry transfers and as exclusive distributor for the Italian Market of the typesetting machines of the Compugraphic Society

In 1976, Fiat entered into the Foundry with the aim to run exclusively the Industrial part: the Studio Artistico was then closed and its fonts got under various trade agreements to selected partners: Reber R41 owns the larger authentic fonts collection of The Nebiolo Foundry in the world, based exclusively on the original drawings.

=== Type faces ===
- Hastile
- Lapis
- Egiziano (1905)
- Torino (1908), also known as Romano Moderno
- Inkunabula (1911, Raffaello Bertieri)
- Bodoni (1913)
- Tanagra (published 1924, design 1910 by Natale Varetti)
- Sinibaldi (1926, Bertieri)
- Paganini (1928, Alessandro Butti and Bertieri)
- Ottocento (1930)
- Iliade (1930, Bertieri)
- Semplicità (c. 1928–1931)
- Veltro (1931)
- Gotico
- Ruano (1933, Bertieri)
- Neon (1935, G. da Milano)
- Razionale (1935, G. da Milano)
- Resolut (1937, H. Brünnel)
- Quirinus (1939, Butti)
- Welt (1931, Hans Wagner), originally cast by Ludwig & Mayer.
  - Landi (1939–43, Butti and Novarese), variations on Welt.
- Athenaeum (1945, Butti and Novarese)
- Normandia (1946–49, Butti and Novarese)
- Rondine (1948, Butti)
- Augustea (1951, Butti and Novarese)
- Fluidum (1951, Butti)
- Microgramma (1951, Butti and Novarese), capitals only
- Cigno (1954, Novarese)
- Fontanesi (1954, Novarese)
- Etrusco (1955, Novarese)
- Egizio (1955–58, Novarese)
- Juliet (1955, Novarese)
- Ritmo (1955, Novarese)
- Garaldus (1956–60, Novarese), a version of Garamond
- Slogan (1957, Novarese)
- Recta (1958–61, Novarese)
- Estro (1961, Novarese)
- Eurostile (1962, Novarese), a version of Microgramma with a lower case.
- Magister (1966, Novarese)
- Oscar (1966, Novarese)
- Forma (1966-7, Novarese, Grignani, Iliprandi, Munari, Negri, Neuberg, Oriani, and Tovaglia)
- Metropol (1967, Novarese)
- Elite (1968, Novarese)
- Stop (1970, Novarese)
- Dattilo (1972/74 Novarese)
- Cigogna (Butti)
- Atalanta

== Printing presses ==
In 1890, Nebiolo began manufacturing printing presses, at first letterpress, but today the company produces the Colora line of sheet-fed offset presses, the Target line of web offset presses, a line of flexo packaging presses, and the Nebiolo Orient, a newspaper web-press.

== Paper ==
In May 2001, Nebiolo acquired the Arbatax papermill, which produces 20% of Italy’s paper, with a yearly production of 130.000 tons of recycled paper for newsprint.
