= Margarita Hickey =

- Born: 1753
- Died: c. 1791 or after 1793; Madrid, Spain
- Other names: Margarita Hickey-Pellizzoni
- Known for: Translation of French drama into Spanish and poetry
- Notable work: Translations of Andromache by Jean Racine and Zaïre by Voltaire into Spanish
- Spouse(s): Juan Antonio de Aguirre, died c. 1779

Margarita Hickey, also known as Margarita Hickey-Pellizzoni (1753–c. 1791 or after 1793) was a Spanish feminist who wrote poetry about her life and beliefs. She is most well known for her translations of French theater works.

== Early life ==
Hickey was born in Barcelona in 1753 to her Italian opera singer mother, born in Milan, and an Irish army officer from Dublin. The family moved to Madrid when Hickey was a child.

== Marriage ==
Hickey, an attractive young woman, married Juan Antonio de Aguirre, a nobleman in his 70s from Navarre. When she was 26, in 1779, her husband died. She never married again. She had many suitors, but the relationships left her disappointed.

== Author, poet, and feminist ==
In 1779, with more time to pursue her interests, Hickey studied geography and worked on her literary pursuits. She wrote about the burgeoning field of geography, yet her Descripcion geografica e historica de todo el orbe conocido hasta ahora (Geographic and Historical Description of the Whole Known World to the Present) was never published. It had been rejected by the Real Academia de la Historia (Spanish Academy of History).

In 18th century, there was a movement to allow for modern women by providing them opportunities to be successful. Benito Jerónimo Feijóo y Montenegro (a Spanish monk who led the Age of Enlightenment in Spain) wrote the polemic Defense of Women in 1726. Josefa Amar wrote Discourse in Defence of Women's Talent and Aptitude for Government and Other Posts Employing Men. It inspired strong Spanish feminists and writers, including Hickey, to write works that "vehemently defended the need to appreciate women in the 18th century." At the same time, many people wanted to keep traditional roles and prevent women from attaining a good education or enter into an occupation.

Her poetry, written under the pseudonym Antonia Hernanda de la Oliva, expressed how her life as a woman was very different from that of men. She believed that educated could be better at science and the arts than men. She also wrote romantic poems. In Poesias varias sagradas, morales y profanas oamorosas (Selected Sacred, Moral and Profane or Amorous Poetry), she wrote about the several sides of love, including aspects of religious and decadent love. An example is the poem, Afectos del alma al amor divino, y desengano y reconocimiento de la fealdad del amor profano (Longings of the Soul for Divine Love, and Disillusion and Recognition of the Ugliness of Profane Love). Her translations of Andromache by Jean Racine and Zaïre by Voltaire were also printed in the book. They were among the first French theatre works translated into Spanish. She wrote poems about the heroism of Captain Velasco and Captain General Pedro Cevallos heroism in 1762 when they battled the British. The book was published by the Royal Press of Madrid in 1789.

She also wrote the poems El veradero (The Truly Wise Man) and De bienes destituidas (Of Property Naught). Her poetry was published within The Defiant Muse: Hispanic Feminist Poems from Middle Ages to the Present. Later in her career, she signed her works with her initials, M.H.

== Death ==
She died in Madrid c. 1791 or after 1793.

== Bibliography ==
- Flores, Angel; Flores, Kate (1986). Hispanic feminist poems from the Middle Ages to the present : a bilingual anthology. New York : Feminist Press at the City University of New York. ISBN 978-0-935312-54-6.
