= Simoncini SA =

- Industry: Type foundry
- Founder: Francesco Simoncini
- Headquarters: Bologna, Italy

Simoncini SA was a manufacturer of linecaster matrices established by Italian type designer Francesco Simoncini shortly after the Second World War. Simoncini had worked with the Ludwig & Mayer foundry before becoming the founder and managing director of his own firm in Bologna, Italy. In 1956, he was invited by Giulio Einaudi to design a new typeface for his publishing house. Einaudi wanted a new face based on Garamond, and the result was Simoncini Garamond, loosely based on the original. It was successfully used by Einaudi, and subsequently adopted by many other publishers. Another of his typefaces, Aster, is still very popular. He designed it in 1958, and originally intended it for use in newspapers and books. Simoncini died in 1967. Digital versions of his fonts are now available through Linotype.

== Typefaces ==
These linecaster matrices were produced by Simoncini:

- Armstrong (1970, F. Simoncini), also available as foundry type from Ludwig & Mayer.
- Aster - Roman w/ Italic & small caps, Roman w/ Bold, superiors & inferiors (1958, F. Simoncini), also available as foundry type from Ludwig & Mayer.
- Aster Cyrillic variant - Roman w/ Italic & small caps, Roman w/ Bold
- Beograd - Cyrillic - Light w/ Italic, Light w/ Bold
- Bodoni - Roman w/ Italic & small caps
- Delia - Light w/ Bold (1951, F. Simoncini)
- Dominante - Roman w/ Bold (1962, Johannes Schweitzer), originally cast by Ludwig & Mayer (1959).
- Greek - Roman one-letter, Italic one-letter
- Ionic - Roman w/ Italic & small caps, Roman w/ Bold
- Life - Roman w/ Italic & small caps, Roman w/ Bold (1965, W. Bilz), also available as foundry type from Ludwig & Mayer.
- Permanent - Light w/ Bold, Light w/ Italic, also available as foundry type from Ludwig & Mayer.
- Permanent Condensed - Light w/ Bold
- Phonetic
- Simoncini Garamond - Roman w/ Italic & small caps, Roman w/ Italic, Roman w/ Bold (1958-61, F. Simoncini and W. Bilz), also known as Garamond #9, also available as foundry type from Ludwig & Mayer.
- Simplicitas - Light w/ Bold, superiors & inferiors
- Selene - Roman w/ Italic & small caps, Roman w/ Bold
- Selene - Cyrillic variant - Roman w/ Italic, Roman w/ Bold
- Simplified Arabic - Light w/ Bold
