= Alessandro Butti =

Italian type designer

- Born: 1893; Italy
- Died: 1959 (aged 65–66); Turin, Italy
- Known for: typography
- Notable work: Microgramma

Alessandro Butti (b. 1893 – d. 1959 in Turin) was an Italian type designer who lived and worked mostly in Turin, where he was art director of the Nebiolo type foundry. He also taught at the Scuola Vigliani-Paravia. Microgramma is his most famous face. After Butti's death, his collaborator on that face, Aldo Novarese, added a lower case which was then called Eurostile.

== Fonts designed by Alessandro Butti ==
- Paganini (1928, Nebiolo) with Raffaello Bertieri
- Quirinus (1939, Nebiolo)
- Landi Echo (1939-43, Nebiolo) with Aldo Novarese, an in-line version of "Welt."
- Athenaeum (1945, Nebiolo) with Aldo Novarese.
- Normandia (1946-49, Nebiolo) with Aldo Novarese.
- Rondine (1948, Nebiolo)
- Augustea (1951, Nebiolo) with Aldo Novarese.
- Fluidum (1951, Nebiolo)
- Microgramma (1951, Nebiolo) with Aldo Novarese.
- Cigogna (Nebiolo)
