= Aldo Novarese =

Italian type designer

- Born: 29 June 1920; Pontestura, Italy
- Died: 16 September 1995 (aged 75); Turin, Italy
- Known for: typography painter
- Notable work: Microgramma, Eurostile, Recta, Stop, Forma, Dattilo, Magister, Center, Equator, Orbital, Egizio, Metropol, Elite, Estro
- Awards: Compasso d'Oro

Aldo Novarese (29 June 1920 – 16 September 1995) was an Italian type designer who lived and worked mostly in Turin.

== Training and career ==
Born in 1920, he entered the G.B. Paravia Typographic School in Turin, where he obtained a diploma. In 1935 he joined the Design Studio of The Nebiolo Foundry in Turin where he collaborated with Alessandro Butti on faces such as Athenaeum, Quirinus, Normandia, Augustea, Microgramma, Fluidum and Rondine. In 1952, giorni in recognition of his uncommon talent he was appointed Director of Nebiolo Art Studio. Since then he designed many new typefaces, among others Cigno, Egizio, Ritmo, Fontanesi, Juliet, Slogan, Garaldus and Recta.

At the Scuola Tipografica in Turin, where he taught drawing from 1949 to 1953, he started a class for the study of typefaces, with the aim of intensifying research work about the ancient Italian tradition in typeface design.

Aldo Novarese published an Italian classification of typefaces which he presented at the “Ecole de Lure”. This classification defines ten basic styles, in which the many thousand faces of the western world may be grouped. This work, which deserved the favourable opinion of international criticism, illustrates the Italian viewpoint on such a long-debated subject.

Aldo Novarese retired from Nebiolo in 1972 and spent almost two years as a consultant of Reber R41, a dry transfer producer; after that period, while keeping his close relationship with Reber R41 he started his career as a freelance type designer and worked all over the world for important companies such as Tygra, ITC, VCG, Mecanorma, Berthold.

He also wrote two important didactic books: Alfabeta in 1964 and Il Segno Alfabetico in 1971.

== Fonts designed by Aldo Novarese ==

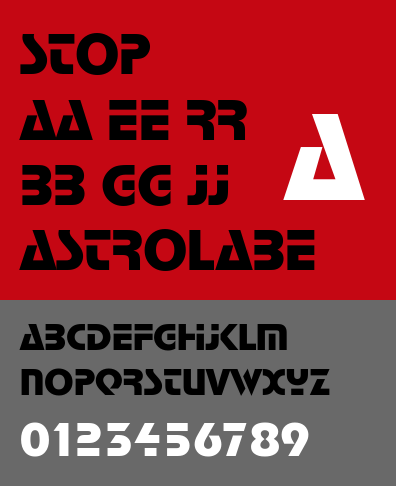
Stop (1970)

Novarese designed more than a hundred typefaces, at the beginning for the Fonderia Nebiolo in Turin -Italy, then for dry transfer companies such as Reber R41 and Mecanorma, phototype industries and traditional Foundries such VCG, ITC Tygra, Berthold and more. One of his most famous designs is probably Eurostile, a geometric sans-serif design. It utilized shapes based on subtly curved rectangles with rounded corners, reflecting the modern designs that were gaining popularity at the time, influenced by the subtly curved shape of a cathode-ray tube screen or aeroplane windows. It became very popular as a typeface that evokes technology (it can be seen on the speedometers on many cars and vehicles, particularly older models). This was an expansion and development of the earlier design Microgramma typeface (designed in a project led by Alessandro Butti), an all-caps design.

=== Foundry Type for Nebiolo ===
- Landi Linear (1939-43), variations on "Welt."
- Athenaeum (1945) with Alessandro Butti; calligraphy-influenced old-style serif font.
- Normandia (1946-49) with Alessandro Butti.
- Augustea (1951) with Alessandro Butti.
- Microgramma (1951) with Alessandro Butti.
- Cigno (1954)
- Fontanesi (1954)
- Egizio (1955-58), a Clarendon design with an italic.
- Juliet (1955)
- Ritmo (1955)
- Garaldus (1956-60)
- Slogan (1957)
- Recta (1958-61)
- Estro (1961)
- Eurostile (1962); copy of Microgramma with lowercase glyphs.
- Magister (1966)
- Oscar (1966)
- Forma (1966-7); supervised by a larger design team. Neo-grotesque sans influenced by Helvetica.
- Metropol (1967)
- Elite (1968)
- Stop (1970), futuristic display font.

=== Photo-Type ===
- Delta (1968)
- Dattilo (1974)
- Lapidar (1977)
- Fenice (1977-80), Didone serif font oriented to display use with an oblique rather than an italic.
- Novarese (1978), wedge-serif font with a nearly upright italic.
- Floreal (1980)
- Mixage (1980), humanist sans-serif.
- Symbol (1982)
- Expert (1983)
- Colossal (1984)
- ITC Symbol (ITC, 1984), an almost sans-serif face with flaring at the ends, slightly similar to Optima or wedge-serif faces. Not a symbol font.
- ITC Mixage (ITC, 1985)
- Arbiter (1989)
