= Kabel =

Geometric sans-serif typeface

- Category: Sans-serif
- Classification: Geometric
- Designer: Rudolf Koch
- Foundry: Gebr. Klingspor
- Date released: 1927
- Variations: ITC Kabel; Neue Kabel

Kabel is a geometric sans-serif typeface designed by Rudolf Koch and released by the Klingspor foundry in 1927.

Kabel belongs to the "geometric" style of sans-serifs, which was becoming popular in Germany during its creation. Based loosely on the structure of the circle and straight lines, it nonetheless applies a number of unusual design decisions, such as a delicately-low x-height (although larger in the bold weight), a tilted 'e' and irregularly-angled terminals, to add delicacy and an irregularity that suggests stylish calligraphy of which Koch was an expert. A variety of rereleases and digitisations have been created.

== Design ==
Kabel shows influence from Expressionism as much as from Modernism, and may be considered as a monoline sans-serif companion of Koch's Koch-Antiqua, sharing many of its character shapes and proportions. This is visible in its low x-height and its two-storey 'g' with a large, partly open lower loop, similar to William Morris's Troy Type, and its 'e' with a tilted centre-stroke, similar to early Renaissance typefaces and also seen in Morris's type designs. The termini of vertical and horizontal strokes are cut an angle, often at right angles to stroke direction, suggesting writing with a pen. This gives Kabel the effect of not quite sitting on the baseline and makes for a more animated, less static feeling than Futura. The capitals vary considerably in width and show influence of Roman square capitals, for instance in the wide 'M' and narrow 'E'. The capital 'W' has a four-terminal form. In the book/regular version, the uppercase 'U' has a stem to the right, which is especially noticeable in the light weight. The capital 'Y' forms a continuous stroke with its tail.

Koch marketed Kabel with a specimen showing the capitals supposedly derived from a construction grid of perfect rectangles and circles, but Walter Tracy and others have noted that this graphic does not really resemble the letters of the printed type, which were clearly drawn freely rather than by uncorrected geometry: "Koch probably drew [his] letters without constraint, and then 'rationalised' them afterwards...Koch was evidently not a man to be bound by arbitrary rules. In Kabel Light the arms of E are actually three different lengths, the bowl of R is deeper than that of B, and in P it is deeper still...and Y does not have the vertical stem shown in the diagram. In short, Koch's sense of style is in command, rather than any geometric formula. The result is an alphabet of capitals that relate perfectly without need [of] 'mathematical harmony'...they are, for my taste, the most attractive of all sans-serif capitals."

Of the name, Adobe's release notes for their version of Kabel comment: "Kabel was not named after any specific cable, although the Zugspitze cable car been completed in 1926, and a Berlin-Vienna facsimile telegraphy line opened in 1927. The name had techie cachet in its day (Piet Zwart's NKF kabel catalogue of 1927 is well-known) and is primarily metaphorical and allusive, a pun referring to both the monolinear construction of the face, and the role of type as a means of communication."

== Release ==
The original release of Kabel was in four weights: Light (released first), Medium/Book, Heavy, and Black. The latter has a redesigned structure to fit the thicker strokes, with an enlarged x-height and more regularity, without the angled terminals of the lighter weights. Also released was an inline design, "Prisma", a headline weight "Zeppelin", and condensed weights.

Some metal type releases offered stylistic alternates, alternate characters with a different design. Many reduced the eccentricities of Kabel and in particular made it more resemble Futura, which was very dominant in printing of the period. (This offering of Futura-like alternates such as a single-storey 'a', which historian Paul Shaw has called a "Futura-ectomy", was common among other sans-serifs of the time, including Monotype's Gill Sans, Linotype's Metro and Erbar.)

Originally released by the Gebr. Klingspor Foundry, the design continued to be made available by the Stempel Foundry (which bought Klingspor in 1956, having already owned some shares) and briefly for phototypesetting systems. Linotype continues to sell Kabel in digital format. Owing to Kabel's popularity, many adaptations and simple knock-offs were sold by other companies, such as Phil Martin's Alphabet Innovations. This particularly occurred in the phototypesetting and digital type periods, taking advantage of the lack of international copyright protection for typefaces.

=== ITC Kabel ===
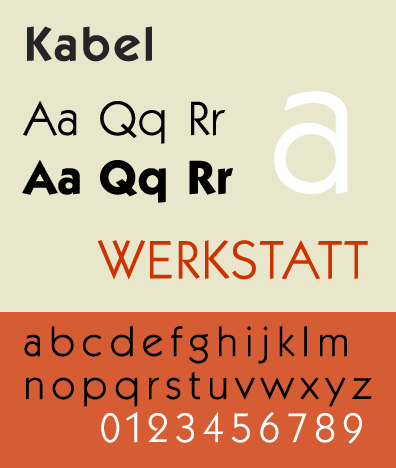
ITC Kabel

Victor Caruso's 1975 adaptation for phototypesetting was created for the International Typeface Corporation, licensing the design rights from Stempel. It follows the standard ITC approach of a dramatically increased x-height accompanied by a unified set of weights from Book to Ultra, for instance retaining the angled-terminal motif into the bold weights.

ITC also sold ITC Grizzly, an adaptation of the bold weight.

=== Neue Kabel ===
A 2016 release by Marc Schütz with an x-height between the original and the ITC digitisation in 9 weights with italic styles to complement them. Another distinction that Neue Kabel has are stylistic alternates such as lower-case letters "a", "g", "e" and "l", circular and 45° square tittles.

=== Other ===
Bhikkhu Pesala created the open-source revival Kabala, named after a Pāli word meaning 'a morsel of food' due to its intended use in Buddhist religious publications. This release is inspired by the ITC weight set and structure, but adds a number of features including italics, small caps and combined characters.

Ray Larabie's Canada 1500 was based loosely on the original Kabel, with its low x-heights. Commissioned with a full set of characters to support the languages of Canada, he donated the original version, "Canada 150," to the government of Canada upon its 2015 completion for use in Canadian sesquicentennial celebrations, then released it into the public domain shortly before Canada Day 2017 (the day of the sesquicentennial) as what he described as a "birthday gift" to his native country.

Finnish typeface designer Tomi Haaparanta designed the Kaapeli typeface with inspiration from the Kabel typeface.

== Prominent usage ==
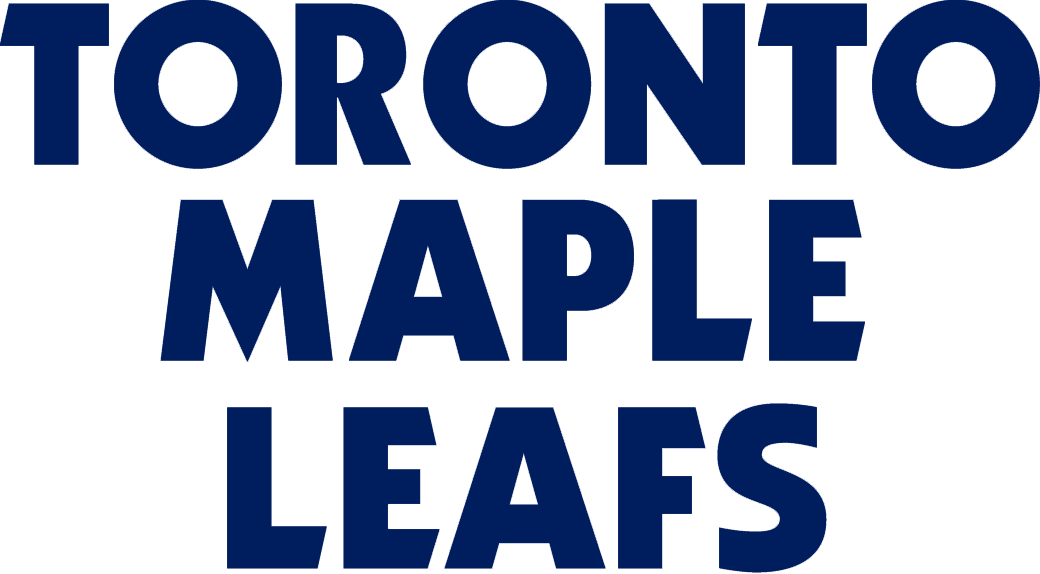
The Toronto Maple Leafs wordmark from 1970 to 2016 used Kabel

- Kabel is used in the popular board game Monopoly.
- ITC Kabel Demi is used in the game Sonic Boom: Rise of Lyric.
- The typeface was used in the opening credits for Yellow Submarine and Weird Science.
- The 1981-1987 opening sequence for the NBC Daytime soap opera Another World used Kabel black for its title cards.
- Kabel Black in lower-case is used as the typeface in the logo for supermarket chain Piggly Wiggly.
- Kabel Black was used as the typeface for the logo for defunct Australian supermarket chain Franklins.
- Kabel was used as a typeface for music video credit tags on MTV from 1981 to 2007. It was also previously used on other MTV sister stations like MTV2 and MTV Hits, last being used on MTV Jams in 2011. Neue Kabel was used by the MTV 80s European channel for its overall branding, which replaced VH1 Classic Europe.
- Kabel is used as the typeface in the Chuck E. Cheese logo since 1989.
- Kabel was used in the video game Rock Band. It was used for song credit tags when you start playing a song during gameplay, Kabel black was also used for the game's instruction manual.
- The Toronto Maple Leafs of the National Hockey League used Kabel for its wordmark from 1970-71 through 2015-16, for the nameplates on their sweaters from 1997-98 through 2009-10, and for the numbers from 1997-98 through 1999-2000.
- A modified version of Kabel Black (with the dot on the I replaced with a triangle) was used as the font for the logo of Six Flags Entertainment Corporation from their 1962 rebrand until their 2024 merger with rival Cedar Fair.

Google's corporate typeface, Product Sans, has some similarities to Kabel, in particular the angled 'e', but other features such as the 'M' and 'g' are very different, resembling Helvetica or Futura.

The font was also used as the base for the covers of the Dungeon Crawler Carl books, though it is modified. ^{[22]}
