= Italic type =

Font style with cursive typeface and slanted design

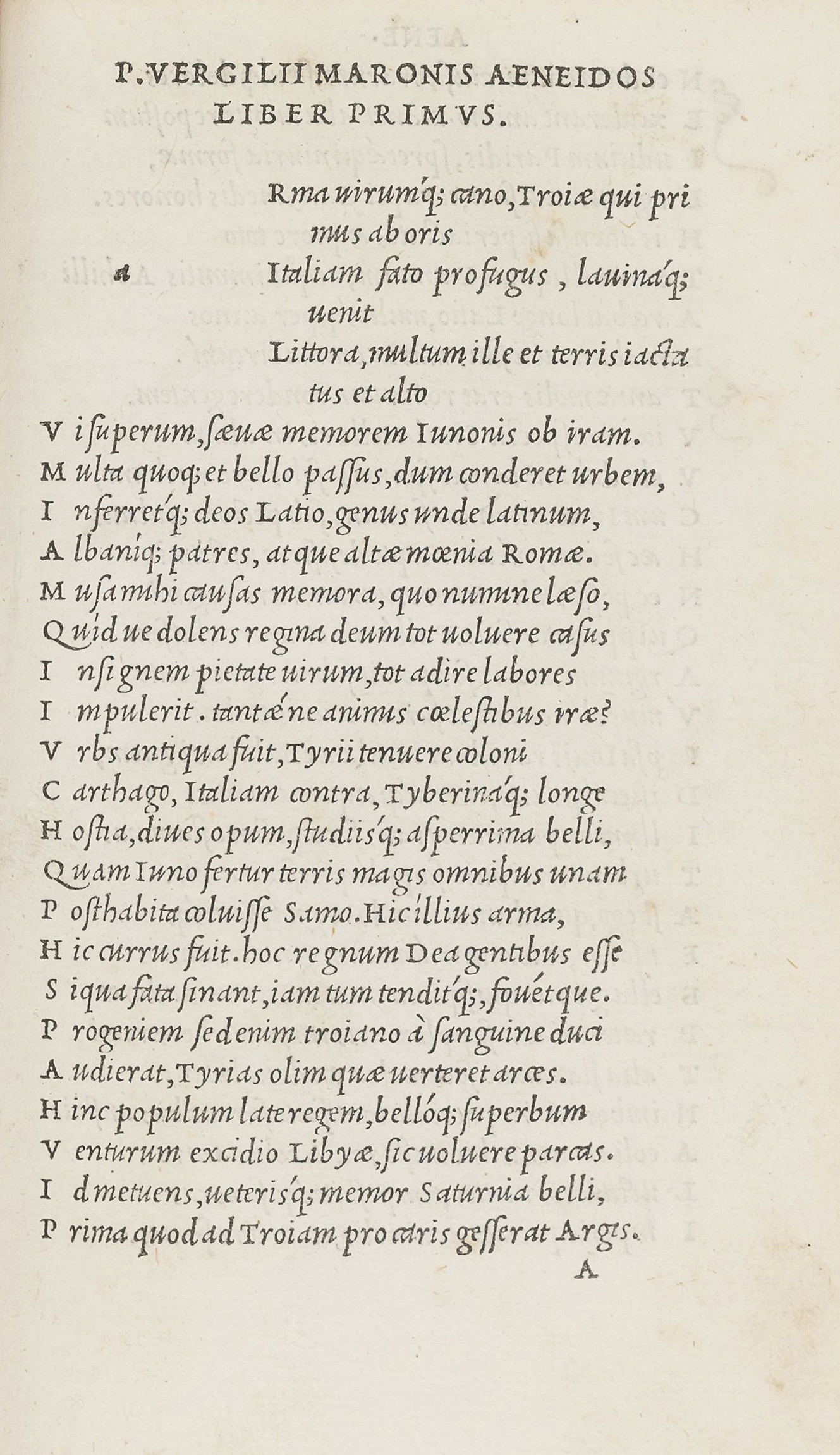
Aldus Manutius' italic, in a 1501 edition of Virgil. Italic is only used for the lower case and not for capitals.

In typography, italic type (or italics, plurale tantum) is a cursive font based on a stylised form of calligraphic handwriting. Along with blackletter and roman type, it served as one of the major typefaces in the history of Western typography. Owing to the influence from calligraphy, italics normally slant slightly to the right, like so. Different glyph shapes from roman type are usually used – another influence from calligraphy – and upper-case letters may have swashes, flourishes inspired by ornate calligraphy.

Historically, italics were a distinct style of type used entirely separately from roman type, but they have come to be used in conjunction – most fonts now come with a roman type and an oblique version (generally called "italic" though often not true italics). In this usage, italics are a way to emphasise key points in a printed text, to identify many types of creative works, to cite foreign words or phrases, or, when quoting a speaker, a way to show which words they stressed. One manual of English usage described italics as "the print equivalent of underlining"; in other words, underscore in a manuscript directs a typesetter to use italic.

In fonts which do not have true italics, oblique type may be used instead. The difference between true italics and oblique type is that true italics have some letterforms different from the roman type, but in oblique type letters are just slanted without changing the roman type form. The name comes from the fact that calligraphy-inspired typefaces were first designed in Italy, to replace documents traditionally written in a handwriting style called chancery hand. Aldus Manutius and Ludovico Arrighi (both between the 15th and 16th centuries) were the main type designers involved in this process at the time.

== History ==
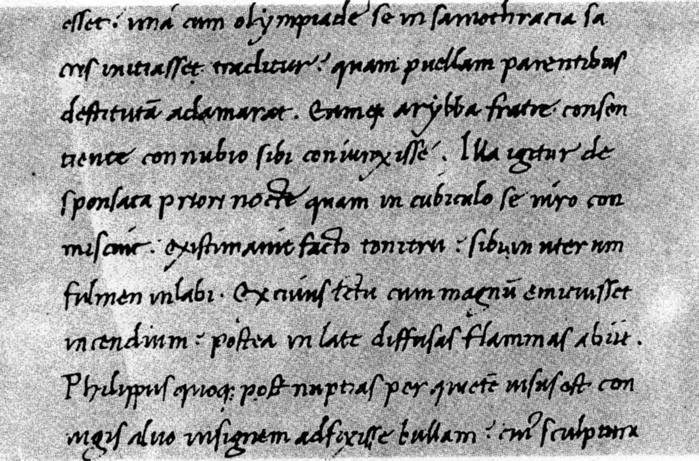
Sample of Niccoli's cursive script, which developed into Italic type

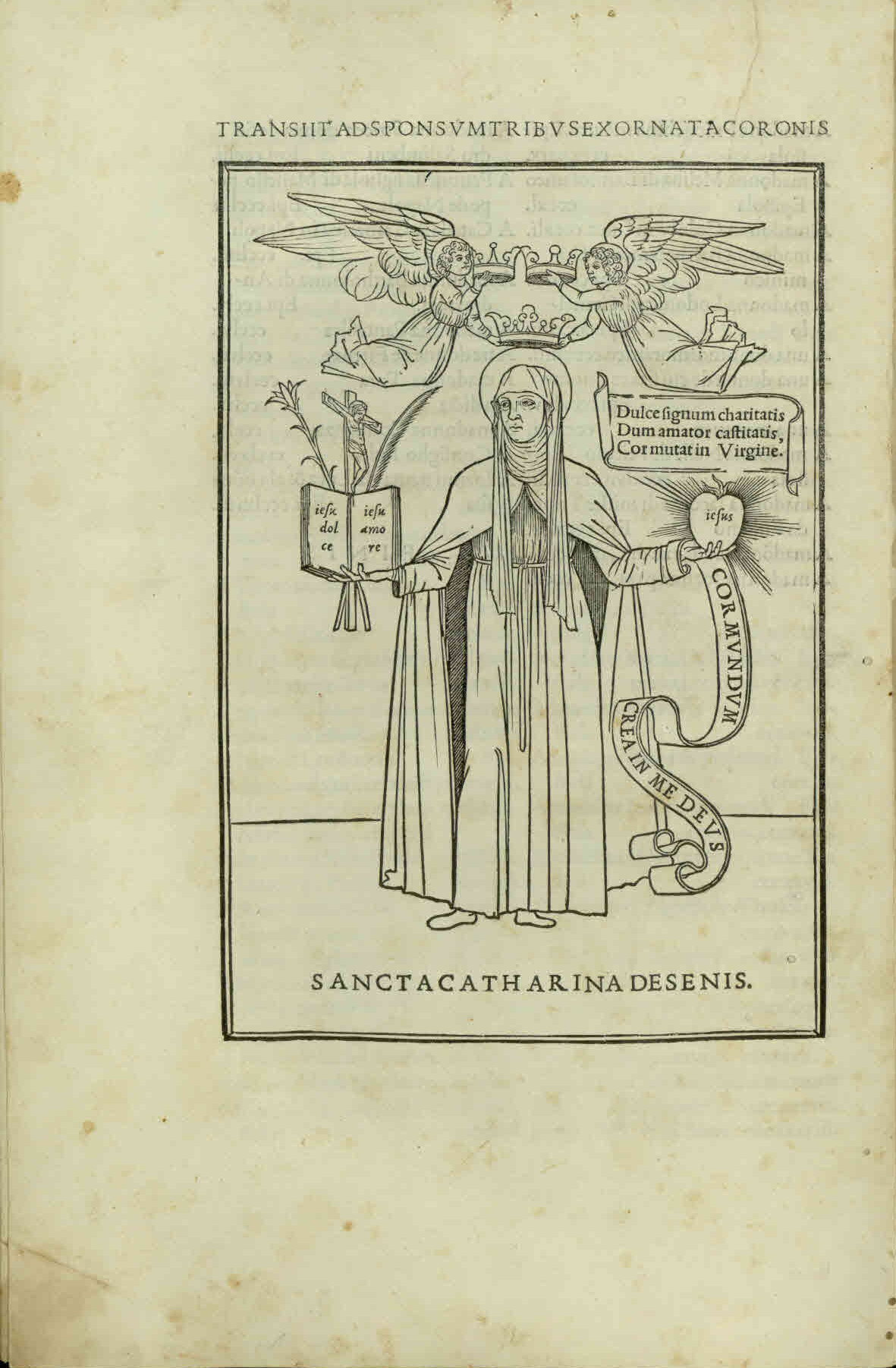
Catherine of Siena, Epistole ("Letters"), published in Venice by Aldo Manuzio in September 1500: illustrated table in which appear the first words ever printed in italics: iesus, inside the heart in the left hand and iesu dolce iesu amore inside the book in the right hand.

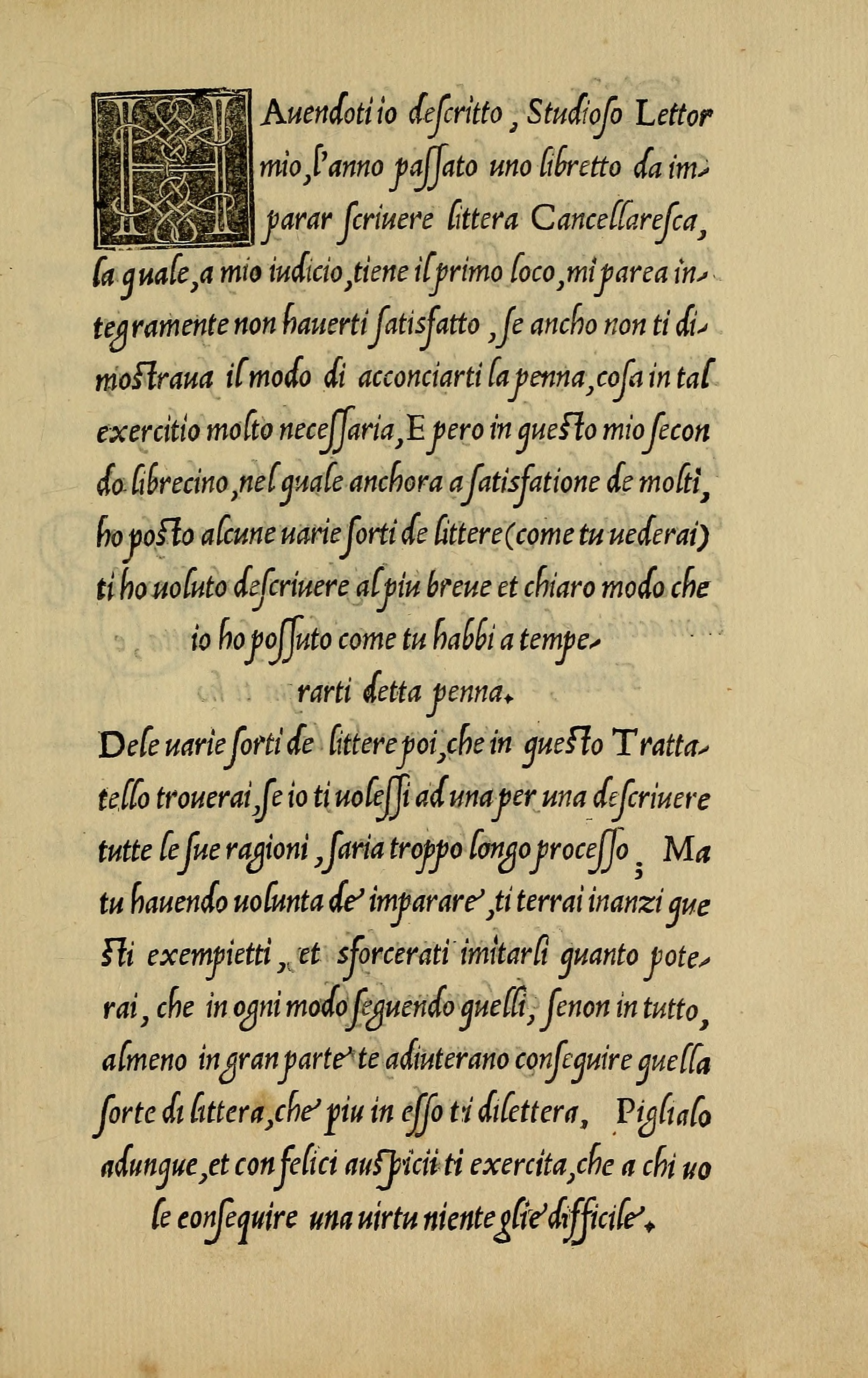
A page from La Operina by Ludovico Vicentino degli Arrighi, showing early "chancery italic" typeface

Italic type was first used by printer and humanist Aldus Manutius and his press in Venice in 1500. Manutius intended his italic type to be used not for emphasis but for the text of small, easily carried editions of popular books (often poetry), replicating the style of handwritten manuscripts of the period. The choice of using italic type, rather than the roman type in general use at the time, was apparently made to suggest informality in editions designed for leisure reading. (Note: It has been suggested that his choice to publish such small, cheap editions was the result of a recession beginning in 1500, the result of war with the Ottoman Empire.) Manutius' italic type was cut by his punchcutter Francesco Griffo (who later, following a dispute with Manutius, claimed to have conceived it). It replicated handwriting of the period following from the style of Niccolò de' Niccoli, possibly even Manutius' own.

The first use in a complete volume was a 1501 edition of Virgil dedicated to Italy, although it had been briefly used in the frontispiece of a 1500 edition of Catherine of Siena's letters. In 1501, Aldus wrote to his friend Scipio:

We have printed, and are now publishing, the Satires of Juvenal and Persius in a very small format, so that they may more conveniently be held in the hand and learned by heart (not to speak of being read) by everyone.

Manutius' italic was different in some ways from modern italics, being conceived for the specific use of replicating the layout of contemporary calligraphers like Pomponio Leto and Bartolomeo Sanvito. The capital letters were upright capitals on the model of Roman square capitals, shorter than the ascending lower-case italic letters, and were used at the start of each line followed by a clear space before the first lower-case letter. While modern italics are often more condensed than roman types, historian Harry Carter describes Manutius' italic as about the same width as roman type. To replicate handwriting, Griffo cut at least sixty-five tied letters (ligatures) in the Aldine Dante and Virgil of 1501. Italic typefaces of the following century used varying but reduced numbers of ligatures.

Italic type rapidly became very popular and was widely (and inaccurately) imitated. The Venetian Senate gave Aldus exclusive right to its use, a patent confirmed by three successive Popes, but it was widely counterfeited as early as 1502. Griffo, who had left Venice in a business dispute, cut a version for printer Girolamo "Gershom" Soncino, and other copies appeared in Italy and in Lyon. The Italians called the character Aldino, while others called it Italic. Italics spread rapidly; historian H. D. L. Vervliet dates the first production of italics in Paris to 1512. Some printers of Northern Europe used home-made supplements to add characters not used in Italian, or mated it to alternative capitals, including Gothic ones.

Jan van Krimpen's Cancelleresca Bastarda, a 20-century revival of the chancery italic style

Besides imitations of Griffo's italic and its derivatives, a second wave appeared of "chancery" italics, most popular in Italy, which Vervliet describes as being based on "a more deliberate and formal handwriting [with] longer ascenders and descenders, sometimes with curved or bulbous terminals, and [often] only available in the bigger sizes." Chancery italics were introduced around 1524 by Arrighi, a calligrapher and author of a calligraphy textbook who began a career as a printer in Rome, and also by Giovanni Antonio Tagliente of Venice, with imitations rapidly appearing in France by 1528. Chancery italics faded as a style over the course of the 16th century, although revivals were made beginning in the 20th century. (Note: Notable revivals include Bembo Narrow Italic, Centaur Italic or Arrighi, Poetica and Requiem.) Chancery italics may have backward-pointing serifs or round terminals pointing forwards on the ascenders.

Italic capitals with a slope were introduced in the 16th century. The first printer known to have used them was Johann or Johannes Singriener in Vienna in 1524, and the practice spread to Germany, France and Belgium. Particularly influential in the switch to sloped capitals as a general practice was Robert Granjon, a prolific and extremely precise French punchcutter particularly renowned for his skill in cutting italics. Vervliet comments that among punchcutters in France "the main name associated with the change is Granjon's."

The evolution of use of italic to show emphasis happened in the 16th century and was a clear norm by the 17th century. The trend of presenting types as matching in typefounders' specimens developed also over this period. Italics developed stylistically over the following centuries, tracking changing tastes in calligraphy and type design. One major development that slowly became popular from the end of the 17th century was a switch to an open form h matching the n, a development seen in the Romain du roi type of the 1690s, replacing the folded, closed-form h of 16th- and 17th-century italics, and sometimes simplification of the entrance stroke.

== Examples ==
True italic forms are generally cursive in nature, while oblique faces are typically sloped versions of the roman face. Here is an example of normal (roman) and true italics text:

Example text set in both roman and italic type

In oblique text, the same type is used as in normal type, but slanted to the right:

The same example text set in oblique type

== Usage ==
A common view of when to use italics and bold text. An additional option for emphasis is to use small capitals for a word or name to stand out.

- Emphasis: "Smith wasn't the only guilty party, it's true". This often corresponds with stress in speech.
- The titles of works that stand by themselves, such as books (including those within a larger series), albums, paintings, plays, television shows, movies, and periodicals: "He wrote his thesis on The Scarlet Letter". Works that appear within larger works, such as short stories, poems, newspaper articles, songs, and television episodes are not italicised, but merely set off in quotation marks. When italics are unavailable, such as on a typewriter or websites that do not support formatting, an underscore or quotes are often used instead.
- The names of ships: "The Queen Mary sailed last night."
- Foreign words (excluding proper nouns), including the Latin binomial nomenclature in the taxonomy of living organisms: "A splendid coq au vin was served"; "Homo sapiens".
- The names of newspapers and magazines: "My favorite magazine is Psychology Today, and my favorite newspaper is the Chicago Tribune."
- Mentioning a word as an example of a word rather than for its semantic content (see use–mention distinction): "The word the is an article".
  - Using a letter or number mentioned as itself:
    - John was annoyed; they had forgotten the h in his name once again.
    - When she saw her name beside the 1 on the rankings, she finally had proof that she was the best.
- Introducing or defining terms, especially technical terms or those used in an unusual or different way: "Freudian psychology is based on the ego, the super-ego, and the id."; "An even number is one that is a multiple of 2."
- Sometimes in novels to indicate a character's thought process: "This can't be happening, thought Mary."
- Italics are used in the King James Version to de-emphasise words "that have no equivalent in the original text but that are necessary in English": "And God saw the light, that it was good".
- Algebraic symbols (constants and variables) are conventionally typeset in italics: "The solution is n = 2."
- Symbols for physical quantities and mathematical constants: "The speed of light, c, is approximately equal to 3.00×10^{8} m/s."
- In biology, gene names (for example, lacZ) are written in italics whereas protein names are written in roman type (e.g. β-galactosidase, which the lacZ gene codes for).
- Italics are frequently used in comics. A letterer may opt to use italic text for a variety of situations, such as internal monologues, captions, words from other languages, and text rendered inside certain types of speech balloons (such as thought balloons). Bolded words are commonly also rendered in italic.
- In older English usage, writers italicised words much more freely, for emphasis, for instance John Donne:
  No man is an Iland, intire of it selfe; every man is a peece of the Continent, a part of the maine; if a Clod bee washed away by the Sea, Europe is the lesse, as well as if a Promontorie were ...
- In numbering UK Acts of Parliament within a given year (prior to 1963, a given session), personal acts have italic Arabic numerals, whereas public general acts have plain Arabic numerals and local acts have lowercase Roman numerals.

== Oblique type compared to italics ==
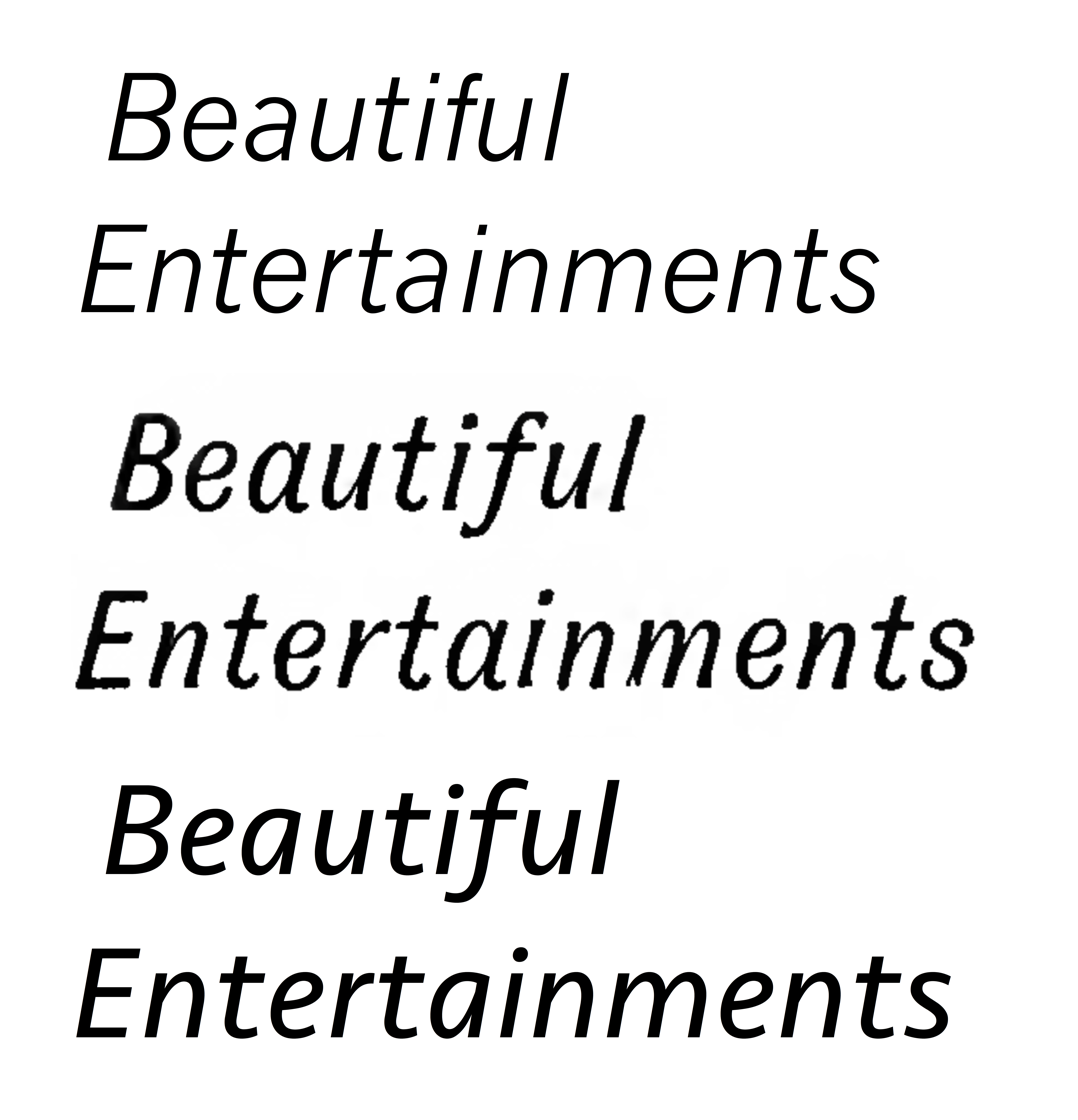
Three sans-serif italics. News Gothic, a 1908 grotesque design, has an oblique 'italic', like many designs of the period. Gothic Italic no. 124, an 1890s grotesque, has a crisp true italic resembling Didone serif families of the period. Seravek, a modern humanist family, has a more informal italic in the style of handwriting.

Oblique type (or slanted roman, sloped roman) is type that is slanted, but lacking cursive letterforms, with features like a non-descending f and double-storey a, unlike "true italics". Many sans-serif typefaces use oblique designs (sometimes called "sloped roman" styles) instead of italic ones; some have both italic and oblique variants. Type designers have described oblique type as less organic and calligraphic than italics, which in some situations may be preferred. Contemporary type designer Jeremy Tankard stated that he had avoided a true italic a and e in his sans-serif Bliss due to finding them "too soft", while Hoefler and Frere-Jones have described obliques as more "keen and insistent" than true italics. Adrian Frutiger has described obliques as more appropriate to the aesthetic of sans-serifs than italics. In contrast, Martin Majoor has argued that obliques do not contrast enough from the regular style.

Almost all modern serif fonts have true italic designs. In the late nineteenth and early 20th centuries, a number of type foundries such as American Type Founders and Genzsch & Heyse offered serif typefaces with oblique rather than italic designs, especially display typefaces but these designs (such as Genzsch Antiqua) have mostly disappeared. An exception is American Type Founders' Bookman, offered in some releases with the oblique of its metal type version. An unusual example of an oblique font from the inter-war period is the display face Koch Antiqua. With a partly oblique lower case, it also makes the italic capitals inline in the style of blackletter capitals in the larger sizes of the metal type. It was developed by Rudolph Koch, a type designer who had previously specialised in blackletter font design (which does not use italics); Walter Tracy described his design as "uninhibited by the traditions of roman and italic".

The printing historian and artistic director Stanley Morison was for a time in the inter-war period interested in the oblique type style, which he felt stood out in text less than a true italic and should supersede it. He argued in his article Towards an Ideal Italic that serif book typefaces should have as the default sloped form an oblique and as a complement a script typeface where a more decorative form was preferred. He made an attempt to promote the idea by commissioning the typeface Perpetua from Eric Gill with a sloped roman rather than an italic, but came to find the style unattractive; Perpetua's italic when finally issued had the conventional italic a, e and f. Morison wrote to his friend, type designer Jan van Krimpen, that in developing Perpetua's italic "we did not give enough slope to it. When we added more slope, it seemed that the font required a little more cursive to it." (Note: Spelling modernised to avoid confusion–Morison wrote 'fount', the usual spelling in British English at the time.) A few other type designers replicated his approach for a time: Van Krimpen's Romulus and William Addison Dwiggins' Electra were both released with obliques. (Note: Electra was later reissued–although not in Britain–with a true italic, which is the only form most digitisations include. An exception is Jim Parkinson's Aluminia revival, which includes both. Romulus was issued on Morison's plan with an oblique a script typeface companion, Cancelleresca Bastarda, which has longer ascenders and descenders than Romulus does. Digital period type designer James Puckett describes the obliques on both Romulus and Electra as "spectacular failures [which] pretty much killed the idea for serifed types.") Morison's Times New Roman typeface has a very traditional true italic in the style of the late 18th century, which he later wryly commented owed "more to Didot than dogma".

Some serif designs primarily intended for headings rather than body text are not provided with an italic, Engravers and some releases of Cooper Black and Baskerville Old Style being common examples of this. In addition, computer programmes may generate an 'italic' style by simply slanting the regular style if they cannot find an italic or oblique style, though this may look awkward with serif fonts for which an italic is expected. Professional designers normally do not simply tilt fonts to generate obliques but make subtle corrections to correct the distorted curves this introduces. Many sans-serif families have oblique fonts labelled as italic, whether or not they include "true italic" characteristics.

== More complex usage ==
=== Italics within italics ===
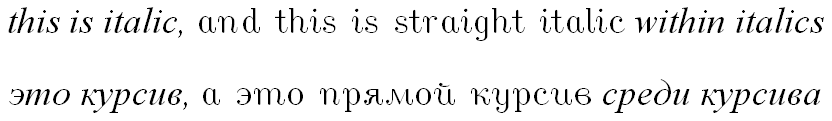
Straight italic type within normal italics (Latin and Cyrillic)

If something within a run of italics needs to be italicised itself, the type is normally switched back to non-italicized (roman) type: "I think The Scarlet Letter had a chapter about that, thought Mary." In this example, the title ("The Scarlet Letter") is within an italicised thought process and therefore this title is non-italicised. It is followed by the main narrative that is outside both. It is also non-italicised and therefore not obviously separated from the former. The reader must find additional criteria to distinguish between these. Here, apart from using the attribute of italic–non-italic styles, the title also employs the attribute of capitalization. Citation styles in which book titles are italicised differ on how to deal with a book title within a book title; for example, MLA style specifies a switch back to roman type, whereas The Chicago Manual of Style (14.94) specifies the use of quotation marks (A Key to Whitehead's "Process and Reality"). An alternative option is to switch to an 'upright italic' style if the typeface used has one; this is discussed below.

=== Left-leaning italics ===
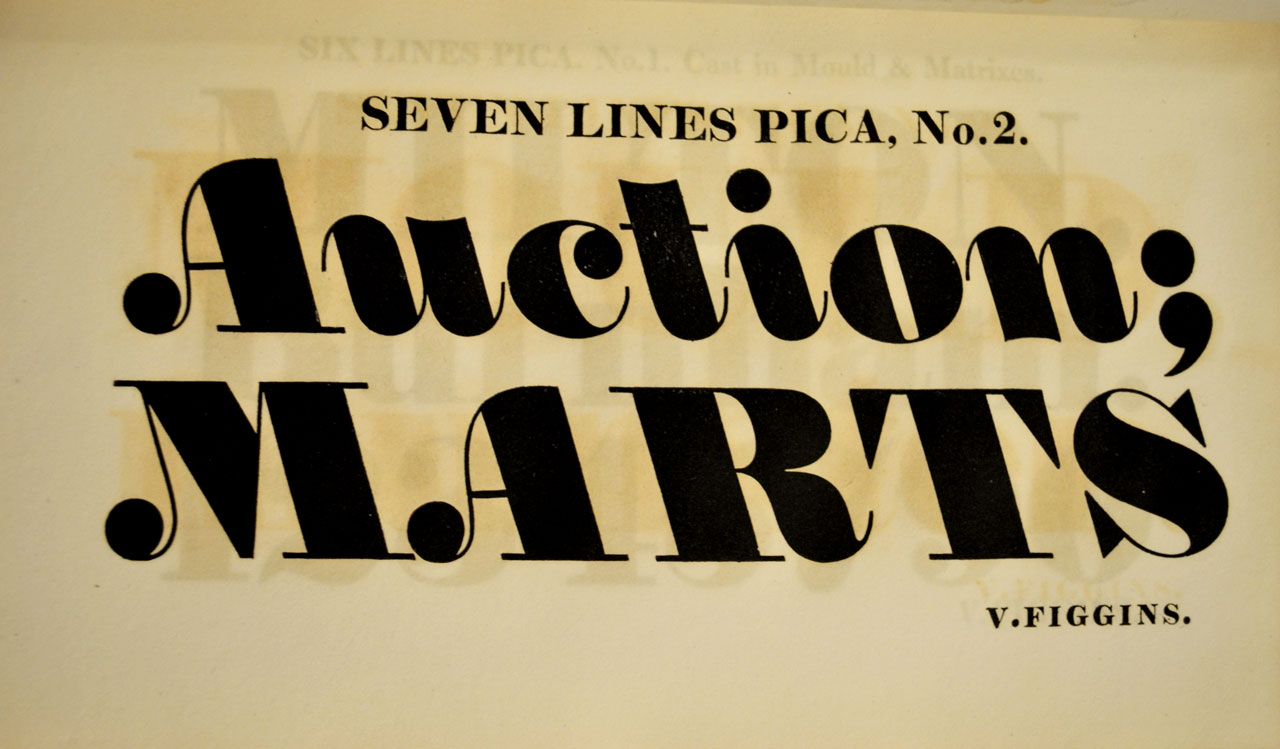
A 'backslanted' italic fat face typeface, made for display use by the Figgins foundry of London. The typeface is an example of the increasingly attention-grabbing, bold and dramatic fonts becoming popular in British display typography in the early 19th century.

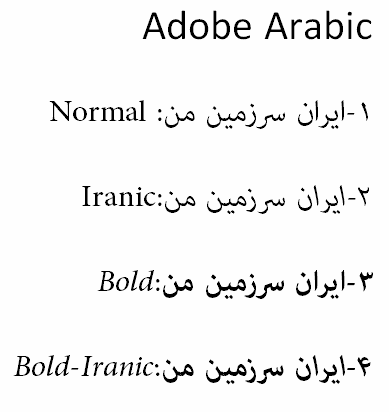
4 shapes of Adobe Arabic font (Normal, Iranic, Bold, Bold-Iranic)

Left-leaning italics are now rare in Latin script, where they are mostly used for the occasional attention-grabbing effect. They have also been proposed to denote irony or sarcasm. In the 1950s, Gholamhossein Mosahab invented the Iranic font style, a back-slanted italic form to go with the right-to-left direction of the script. Some modern Arabic fonts (e.g. Adobe Arabic or Boutros Advertisers Naskh) support this, and use it when italics is requested. Some font families, such as Venus, Roemisch, Topografische Zahlentafel, include left leaning fonts and letters designed for German cartographic map production, even though they do not support Arabic characters.

=== Upright italics ===
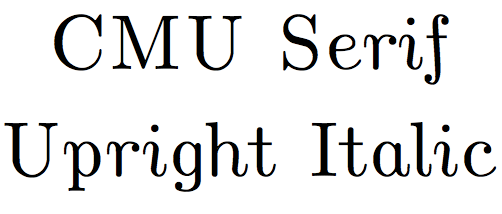
Computer Modern's 'upright italic' font

Since italic styles clearly look different from regular (roman) styles, it is possible to have 'upright italic' designs that have a cursive style but remain upright. In Latin-script countries, upright italics are rare but are sometimes used in mathematics or in complex texts where a section of text already in italics needs a 'double italic' style to add emphasis to it. Donald Knuth's Computer Modern has an alternate upright italic as an alternative to its standard italic, since its intended use is mathematical typesetting.

Font families with an upright or near-upright italic only include Jan van Krimpen's Romanée, Eric Gill's Joanna, Martin Majoor's FF Seria and Frederic Goudy's Deepdene. The popular book typeface Bembo has been sold with two italics: one reasonably straightforward design that is commonly used today, and an alternative upright 'Condensed Italic' design, far more calligraphic, as a more eccentric alternative. This italic face was designed by Alfred Fairbank and named "Bembo Condensed Italic", Monotype series 294. Some Arts and Crafts movement-influenced printers such as Gill also revived the original italic system of italic lower-case only from the 19th century onwards.

=== Parentheses ===
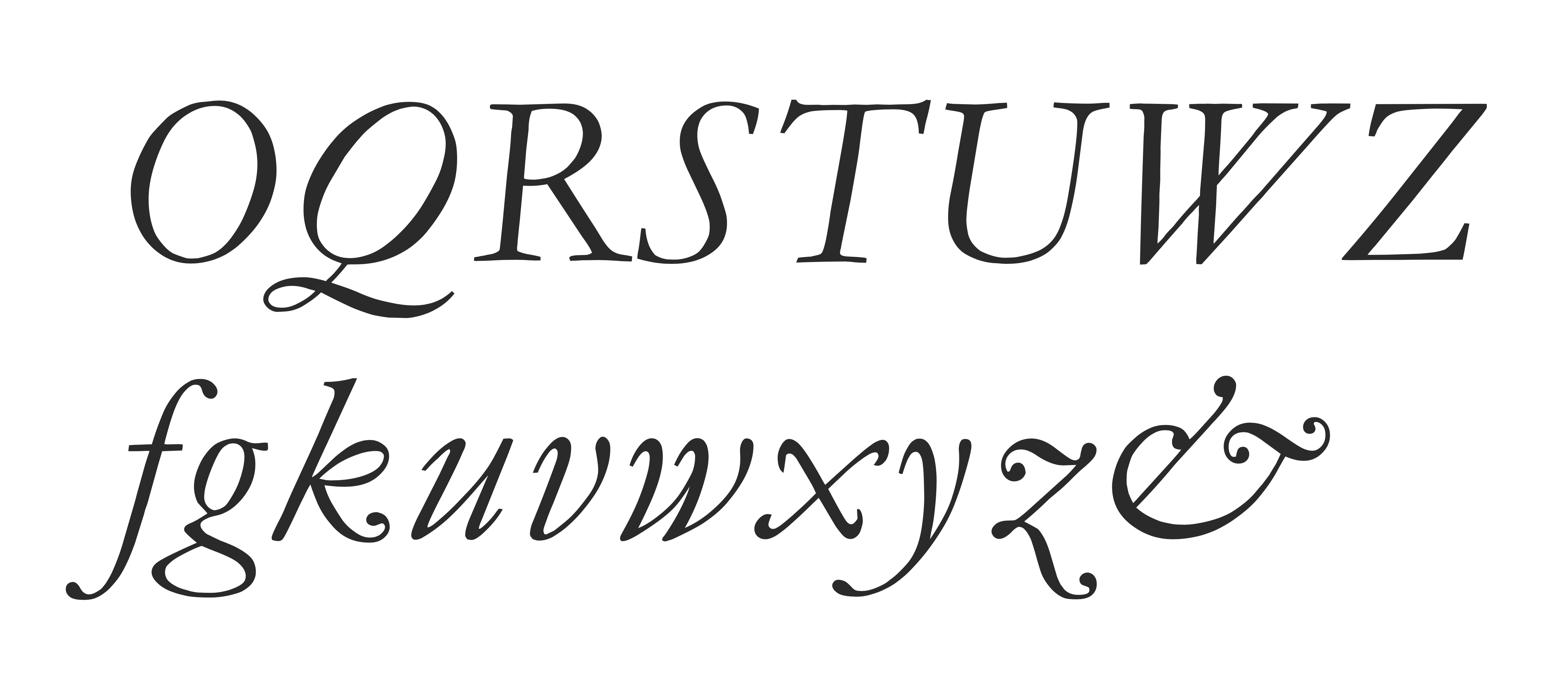
Monotype Garamond's italic replicates the work of 17th-century punchcutter Jean Jannon quite faithfully, with a variable slant on the italic capitals.

The Chicago Manual of Style suggests that parentheses and brackets surrounding text that begins and ends in italic or oblique type should also be italicised (as in this example), to avoid problems such as overlapping and unequally spaced characters. An exception to this rule applies when only one end of the parenthetical is italicised (in which case roman type is preferred, as on the right of this example). In The Elements of Typographic Style, it is argued that since Italic delimiters are not historically correct, the upright versions should always be used, while paying close attention to kerning.

=== Substitutes ===
In media where italicization is not possible, alternatives are used as substitutes:

- In typewritten or handwritten text, underlining is typically used.
- In plain-text computer files, including e-mail communication, italicised words are often indicated by surrounding them with slashes or other matched delimiters. For example:
  - I was /really/ annoyed.
  - They >completely< forgot me!
  - I had _nothing_ to do with it. (Commonly interpreted as underlining, which is an alternative to italics.)
  - It was *absolutely* horrible. (Commonly interpreted as bold. This and the previous example signify italic in Markdown, where bolding uses **double asterisks**, and underlining uses __double underscores__.)
- Where the italics do not indicate emphasis, but are marking a title or where a word is being mentioned, quotation marks may be substituted:
  - The word "the" is an article.
  - The term "even number" refers to a number that is a multiple of 2.
  - The novel "Fahrenheit 451" was written by Ray Bradbury.

=== OpenType ===
OpenType has the ital feature tag to substitute a character to italic form with single font. In addition, the OpenType Font Variation has ital axis for the transition between italic and non-italic forms and slnt axis for the oblique angle of characters.

=== Web pages ===
In HTML, the <i> element is used to produce italic (or oblique) text. When the author wants to indicate emphasised text, modern Web standards recommend using the <em> element, because it conveys that the content is to be emphasised, even if it cannot be displayed in italics. Conversely, if the italics are purely ornamental rather than meaningful, then semantic markup practices would dictate that the author use the Cascading Style Sheets declaration font-style: italic; along with an appropriate, semantic class name instead of an <i> or <em> element.

=== Unicode ===
In Unicode, the Mathematical Alphanumeric Symbols block includes Latin and Greek letters in italics and boldface; however, Unicode expressly recommends against using these characters in general text in place of presentational markup.

== See also ==
- Boldface
- Shear mapping
