= Paraph =

Paraph may refer to:

- Paraph, a flourish at the end of a signature
- Paraph, an alternative name for the pilcrow sign ¶
- Paraphs, a 1928 book by Hermann Püterschein illustrated by William Addison Dwiggins

== See also ==
- Paragraph
