= Metro (typeface) =

Geometric and humanist sans-serif typeface

- Category: Sans-Serif
- Classification: Humanist / Geometric
- Designer: W.A. Dwiggins
- Foundry: Linotype
- Date released: 1929 (Metrolite/black); 1931 (Metrothin/medium); 1932 (Metro No. 2)
- Variations: Chronicle Metro; Metro Office; Metro Nova (shown)
- Also known as: Geometric 415

Metro is a sans-serif typeface family created by William Addison Dwiggins and released by the Mergenthaler Linotype Company in 1929.

Metro was Dwiggins's first typeface, which he created at the age of 49 after establishing himself as one of the pre-eminent lettering artists and book designers of the early 20th century. In 1928, Dwiggins wrote Layout in Advertising, in which he criticized the lack of "good" sans-serif types available. Harry L. Gage, assistant director of typography at Linotype, reviewed the book, and in 1929 he offered to hire Dwiggins to design the "good" sans-serif he felt was lacking. Dwiggins was brought in as a consultant and quickly established a rapport with Chauncey H. Griffith, the company's head of type design, who would manage the production of all his typefaces for the rest of his career.

Metro was inspired by a wave of new "geometric" sans-serif designs such as Futura, which had attracted attention for their basis on simple geometric shapes like circles and straight lines, rather than on the traditional 'grotesque' style of sans-serifs such as Franklin Gothic. While his opinion of these new designs was less negative, Dwiggins was unsatisfied with the lowercase in existing geometric typefaces and decided to create a font with breaks from pure geometry that could make it more interesting to read. In the midst of the geometric vogue, however, his approach proved less popular than hoped, and the typeface was redesigned several years later to more closely resemble the popular Futura. Several digital revivals in recent years have returned to Dwiggins's original designs or offered them as alternates.

== Background and development ==
A 1932 ad shows all four weights of both versions of Metro, emphasizing the typeface's versatility. Of note is the original Metro's use of a straight-bar e, which was an alternate prior to the release of Metro No. 2.

By the time Dwiggins wrote Layout in Advertising, the staff at Mergenthaler were keenly aware of the shortcomings he pointed out. Linotype's system, which cast new type under keyboard control and in solid blocks, was very popular for newspaper use due to its speed advantage over typesetting by hand, but it had been slow to gain acceptance for fine book printing. By the 1920s, the company's leadership had come to feel that the system's chief flaw was a lack of fonts of good design, and they had been working to correct this, having already hired the artistic advisor Edward Everett Bartlett; the British branch had hired the fine printer George W. Jones, and its competitor Monotype Corporation, the commentator on printing Stanley Morison, for similar reasons.

In hiring Dwiggins, it was clear Linotype was after a typeface that could compete with European geometric sans-serifs, which were currently enjoying a vogue. Dwiggins offered that several of these recent releases—namely Kabel, Futura, and Gill Sans—he considered "gothics of good design", but that they were, in his words, "fine in the capitals and bum in the lower-case." He thus endeavored to design a typeface that was less reliant on pure geometry, opting for a two-story a and g, considerable variation in stroke width, and sheared terminals on ascenders and descenders as though drawn with a broadnib pen. These features give his initial design humanist qualities in the vein of Johnston and Gill Sans, but the 1932 redesign largely dispensed with the more overtly humanist elements, and even today it is primarily considered a geometric, like its competitors.

Dwiggins drew only the boldest weight of the family, Metroblack, with three lighter weights extrapolated by the Linotype drawing office based on his design. With a chunky design and wide spacing, Metro was often used in 20th-century American newspapers for section headings (often in competition with other sans-serifs like Futura, Spartan, Tempo and Vogue), and Linotype promoted it as a companion to their 'Legibility Group' of typefaces suitable for printing on poor-quality newsprint paper.

== Metal type releases ==
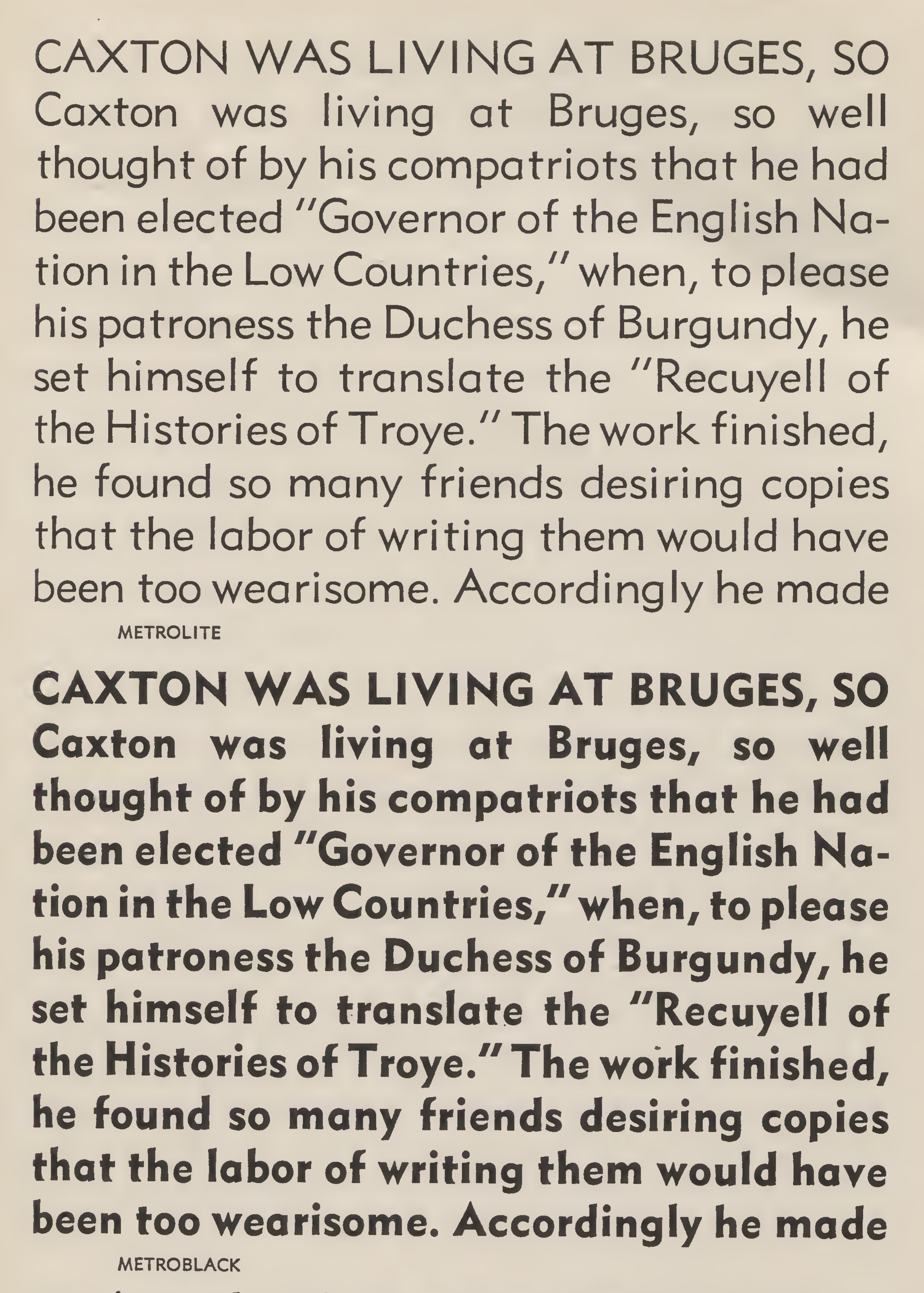
Metrolite and Metroblack No. 2 fonts shown in a Linotype specimen. Both runs of text are cast from the same duplexed matrices which could cast either weight, so the width is identical; the light weight tends to look wider because of the lower stroke width.

Metro was released for Linotype hot-metal composition in the following sets:

- Metrolite + Metroblack (1929)
- Metrothin + Metromedium (1931)
- Metrolite No.2 + Metroblack No.2 (1932)
- Metrolite No.2 Italic + Lining Metrothin + Lining Metromedium (1935)
- Metromedium No.2 Italic + Metroblack No.2 Italic (1937)
- Metrolight No.4 Italic + Metrothin No.4 Italic

The initial release comprised the weights Metrolite and Metroblack, the latter being based directly on Dwiggins's original drawings. As a demonstration, an edition of Wilderness: A Journal of Quiet Adventure in Alaska by Rockwell Kent was printed in Metrolite. Two additional weights, Metrothin and Metromedium, followed in 1931.

The Linotype system imposed limitations on character structure, and it was standard to offer two fonts on the same "duplexed" matrix which therefore had to be the same width. Linotype therefore offered Metrolite and Metroblack as a pair, followed by Metrothin and Metromedium; as a result of being forced to share metrics between weights so far removed from each other, glyph shapes go back and forth between wider and more condensed as they step up in weight.

Art Deco style alternate capitals

The Metro series was redesigned after entering production, with several characters changed to mimic the then-popular Futura family from the Bauer Type Foundry of Germany. The lowercase a and g were made single-story, the curved e was replaced with a more conventional version with a horizontal bar (originally offered as an alternate), and capital A, M, V, and W gained pointed apexes, among other changes. The new family was named "Metro No. 2" and could be formed by switching in the replacement No. 2 matrices. Linotype also offered a few other alternates, including a four-pointed W and an e with an angled crossbar in the manner of Kabel, and "Unique Capitals" in a decorative, Streamline Moderne style.

The italics, predominantly oblique, were a later addition, and are inconsistent through the different weights. Metrothin Italic alone has a descender on the f, along with a straight t in the manner of Futura; the lowercase italic f and t have a more pronounced curve in all other weights, but the lowercase j curiously does not. Few if any of these features have been carried over to digital incarnations, which generally opt for simple obliques (see below).

== Digital revivals and interpretations ==
Several digitizations have been released by Linotype and its owner and former rival, Monotype:

- Metro No. 2, its earliest digital Metro, is based on its use in metal type. It includes three weights: Metrolite, Metromedium, and Metroblack (Metrothin not having made the digital transition), without italics. Two versions of each weight are offered: one with a basic Latin character-set, and one with a more complete collection of accented and special Latin characters.
- Metro Office, designed by Akira Kobayashi and released in 2006, offers a modernized design with some use of Dwiggins' original characters (apart from the rounded lowercase e). As its name suggests, it is intended for word-processing applications, with two weights plus obliques. All four styles share metrics, not just with each other, but with all other members of Linotype's "Office" series, allowing seamless changing of fonts and styles without text reflow. However, this also means that many characters have had their shapes altered, giving it a "looser", more conventional aesthetic compared to the original. The italics also include a lowercase f with descender, which was a feature of Metrothin (though none of the other weights) in the metal version.
- Metro Nova, designed by Toshi Omagari in 2012 for Linotype: The Film and released commercially in 2013, returns to Dwiggins's original drawings while expanding the character-set with a complete range of accented and alternative glyphs. Characters from Metro No. 2 are offered via OpenType stylistic sets, along with text figures and small caps. The range of weights is expanded to seven, along with six condensed weights, all with obliques. The naming of the weights also does not correspond to the original Metro, with the original four weights roughly equating to Light, Regular, Medium and Black in Metro Nova. In creating the expanded range of options, the design has been regularized compared to the original (whose character widths went back and forth between wider and narrower forms due to the duplexing of weights on the Linotype machine), with a distinct character compared to the version in metal. Nevertheless, it is the most complete version on the market by far, with the closest relationship to Dwiggins's original design.

Besides official Linotype digitizations, many unofficial revivals or designs based on Metro have proliferated:

- Bitstream digitized Metro as Geometric 415 in 1990; this version offers three weights (Lite, Medium and Black) plus obliques, with a basic Latin character-set. Tilde also offers a version of this design with a wider range of accented Latin characters. This version of the font is alone among digital offerings to include an oblique that retains the distinctive lowercase f and t glyphs from the metal version.
- Detroit Metro from GroupType, also known as Grosse Pointe Metro or DH Sans, is a version more-or-less directly based on the metal Metro No. 2. The "DH Sans" and "Grosse Point Metro" versions include obliques derived from the upright forms, while "Detroit Metro" also includes a "soft" (rounded) version, as well as two "rough" variants with the outlines filled in imperfectly.
- Examiner NF, by Nick Curtis for Nick's Fonts, is a somewhat looser Metro revival. It includes three weights: Light, Regular and Bold, all with obliques, roughly corresponding to Metrolite, Metromedium and Metroblack.
- Relay, designed by Cyrus Highsmith for Font Bureau in 2002, was inspired by both Dwiggins's Metro and Eric Gill's Gill Sans. It features a distinctive true italic and five weights across four widths, for a combined 20 styles plus italics (40 fonts total).
- Jim Parkinson developed an in-house condensed digital version, Chronicle Metro, for the San Francisco Chronicle in 1997, to accompany a custom version of Dwiggins's Electra. He later reworked this typeface into a separate design, Richmond, released in 2003. Richmond, which also shows influences from ATF's Bernhard Gothic, has five weights plus true italics, four condensed weights (upright only), and inline and shaded caps, for a total of 16 fonts.
- Concourse, released by Matthew Butterick in 2013, is a loose revival adding a wide variety of stylistic alternates and small capitals. Six weights plus italics are offered.
- Mallory, designed by Tobias Frere-Jones, was released through Frere-Jones Type in 2015. Billed as a "transatlantic sans", it takes inspiration from both Metro and Gill Sans; the influence of Metro is especially evident in the lowercase. It is offered in two optical sizes: Regular, with eight weights plus obliques, for text sizes and above in print and display sizes on screen; and MicroPlus, with five weights plus obliques, for very small text in print and body text on screen.
