= Koch-Antiqua =

Serif typeface

Koch-Antiqua is a serif typeface intended for decorative and display use, designed by Rudolf Koch and published by the Klingspor Type Foundry from 1922 onwards. It is a delicate face with a low x-height, intended for decorative printing rather than for extended body text.

Koch-Antiqua was Koch's first roman or "Antiqua" type (the kind generally used in western Europe, as opposed to blackletter writing) and achieved considerable attention both in Germany and abroad. It was exported under the names Locarno and Eve. Walter Tracy described it as "a highly individual design" that "reveals the working of a fastidious mind and a skilful hand . . . perfectly suited to express in print the idea of elegance."

== Family ==
Koch-Antiqua was released in several weights:

- Roman: the regular weight and the only style digitised by Linotype.
- Kursiv: a mixture of a true italic (in which the letters take handwriting forms) and oblique (simply slanted, as in the a). The capitals have a line drawn in them at larger sizes, an effect that in Tracy's words "only a designer thoroughly familiar with the elaborate capitals of some of the older German gothic lettering, and uninhibited by the traditions of roman and italic, would apply." (Note: Although presumably an independent invention, Koch was not the first to think of combining italic with blackletter inline capitals: the idea was used somewhat chaotically by Ghent printer Joos Lambrecht in the introduction to a book of 1539, which also introduced roman type to the Low Countries.)
- Bold (groß) and bold italic: A more "carved" design.
- Oberlängen: Double-height capitals and letters with ascenders, making the lowercase look even smaller and more delicate.
- Decorative capitals: Zierbuchstaben, inline capitals, and Initialen, floral designs created by Koch's associate Willi Harwerth.
- Fett: Extra-bold weight.

A number of unauthorised imitations were later created by American Type Founders under the names of Rivioli and Paramount.

== Digitisations ==
Koch-Antiqua has never been fully digitised, but a number of releases of some of the weights have been created. According to Paul Shaw, Eva Antiqua is the most complete digitisation, which also adds digitisations of the bold weights of the ATF knockoff font Paramount. None of the releases available as of 2011 include the decorative and extra-high letters of the original. At least one freeware implementation uses the Zierbuchstaben as its basis.
