= Jim Parkinson =

American type designer (1941–2025)

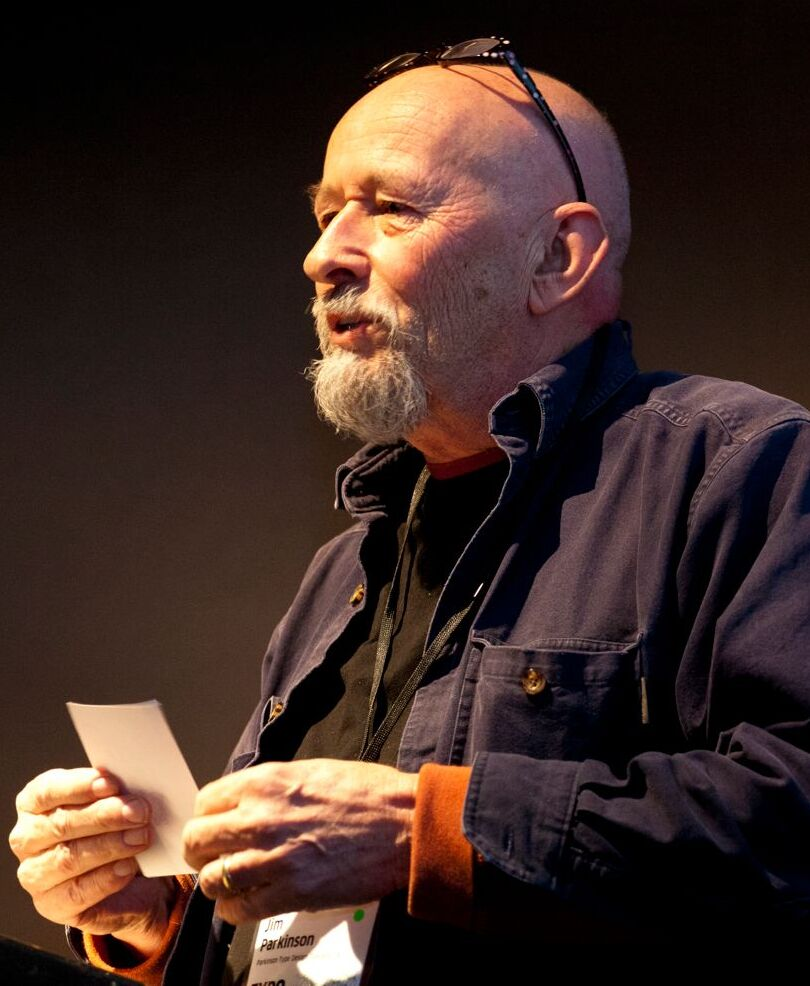
- Parkinson in 2012
- Born: October 23, 1941; Oakland, California, U.S.
- Died: June 26, 2025 (aged 83); Oakland, California, U.S.
- Occupation: Type designer
- Notable work: Rolling Stone masthead, Esquire logo, San Francisco Chronicle nameplate

James Thornley Parkinson (October 23, 1941 – June 26, 2025) was an American lettering artist and type designer in Oakland, California, who was perhaps best known for designing the logo for Rolling Stone.

== Life and career ==
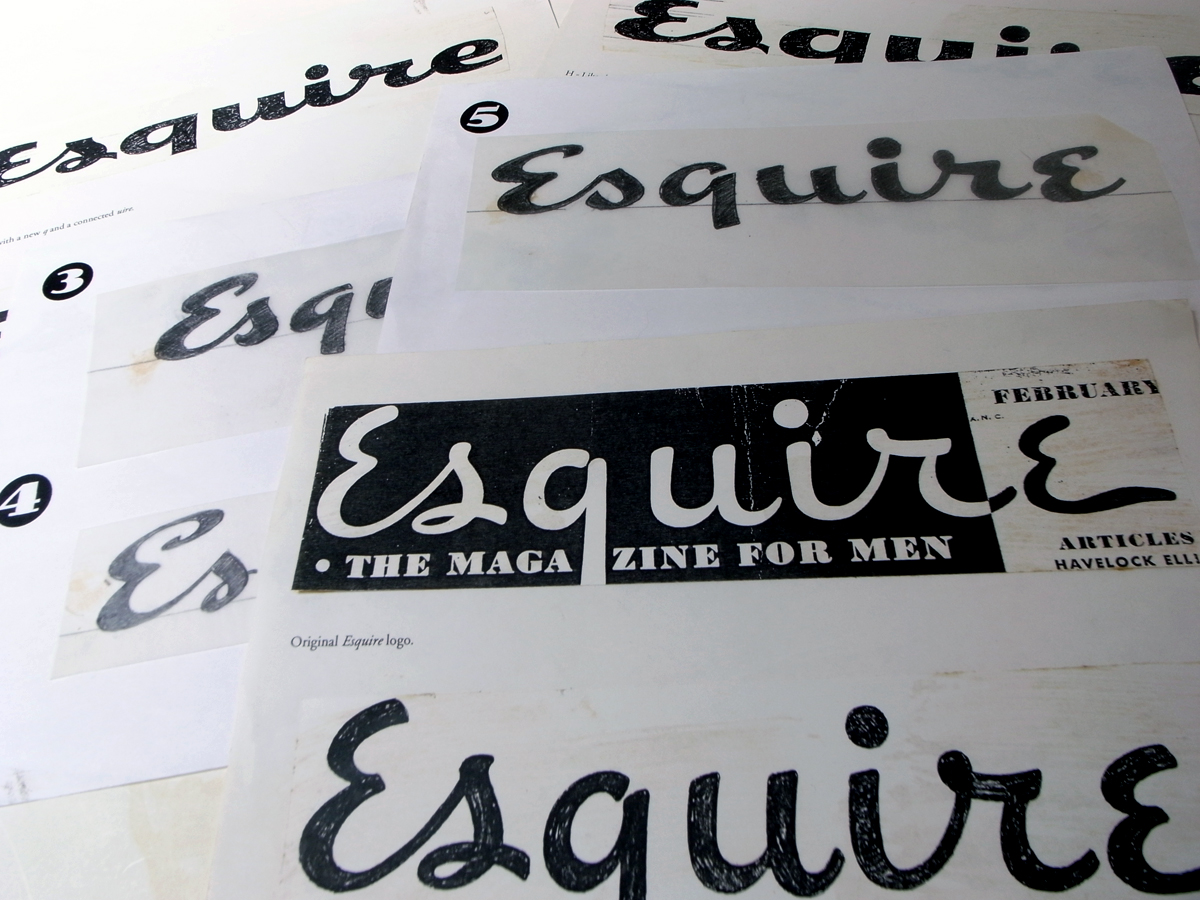
Parkinson's drafts of a logo for Esquire

Parkinson was born on October 23, 1941, in Oakland, California. He studied advertising design and painting at the California College of Arts and Crafts in Oakland, graduating in 1963. In 1964, he worked as a lettering artist for Hallmark Cards under Myron McVay with some consultation from Hermann Zapf. Afterwards, Parkinson moved back to Oakland and freelanced as a lettering artist doing work for rock bands (including Creedence Clearwater, Taj Mahal, The Doobie Brothers, Kansas, et al.), sign painting, advertisements, packaging.

In the mid-1970s, type revivalist Dan X. Solo introduced Parkinson to Roger Black who was, at that time, the newly appointed Art Director for Rolling Stone magazine in San Francisco. Black hired Parkinson to design a series of typefaces and redesign the logo for Rolling Stone.

Parkinson's distinctive Rolling Stone masthead

Although Parkinson’s lettering sensibility was rooted in old wood type and signage from the 19th century and during the first part of his career he used pen and ink for finished pieces, in 1990, Parkinson put away his pen and ink and embraced digital technology while working for the San Francisco Chronicle, designing fonts.

Parkinson operated his independent type foundry Parkinson Type Design in Oakland. His more high-profile clients include Fast Company, Esquire, Billboard, Newsweek, the San Francisco Examiner, and Ringling Bros. and Barnum & Bailey Circus. His font designs have been inspired by lettering and often by the work of William Addison Dwiggins, including adaptations of his Metro and Electra typefaces for the Chronicle and Letterform Archive.

Parkinson died of complications from Alzheimer's disease in Oakland, California, on June 26, 2025. He was 83.

== Typefaces ==
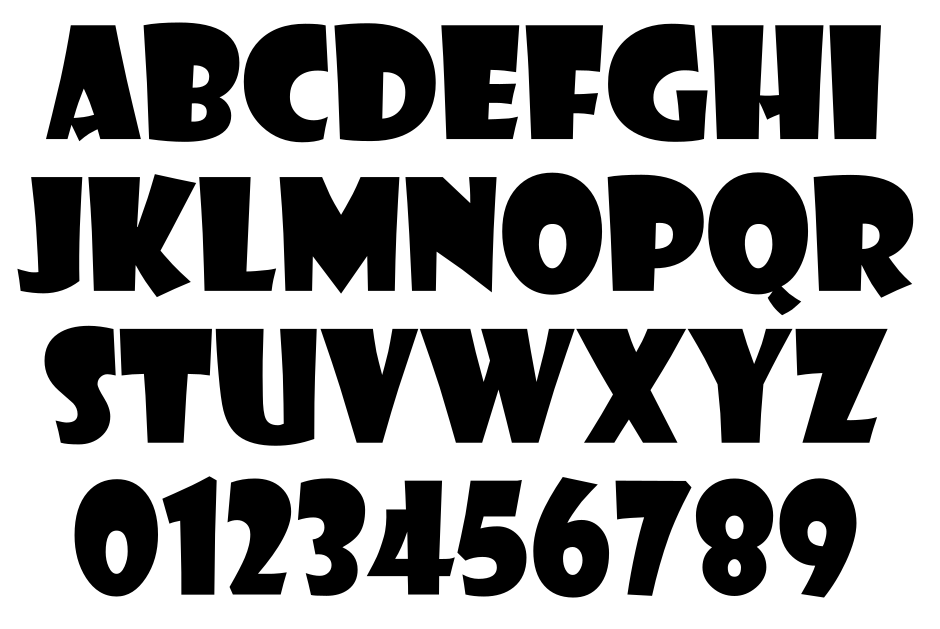
Showcard Gothic, used in the video game Hamsterball

Typefaces designed by Jim Parkinson include:

- LfA Aluminia, 2017
- Amador, 2004
- Amboy, 2001
- Antique Condensed No.2, 1995
- Avebury, 2005
- Azuza, 2001
- Balboa, 2001–2003
- Balboa Plus, 2015
- Benicia, 2003
- ITC Bodoni (with Janice Prescott Fishman, Holly Goldsmith, and Sumner Stone), 1994
- Bonita, 1996
- Cabazon, 2005
- FF Catchwords, 1996
- Chuck, 2004
- Commerce Gothic, 1998
- Comrade, 1998
- Diablo, 2002
- Dreamland, 1999
- El Grande, 1998
- Fresno, 2001
- Generica, 1996
- FF Golden Gate Initials, 1996
- Hoosier Daddy, 2012
- Hotel, 2001
- Industrial Gothic, 2001
- Jimbo, 1995
- Keester, 2001
- FF Matinee, 1996
- Meatball, 2012
- Modesto, 2001–2005
- Mojo, 1960
- Montara, 2002
- FF Motel, 1996
- Parkinson, 1994
- Parkinson Electra, 2011
- Poster Black, 1993
- Pueblo, 1998
- Richmond, 2003
- ITC Roswell, 1998
- Showcard Gothic, 1993 (shown above)
- Showcard Moderne, 1995
- Sutro, 2003-2004
- Sutro Deluxe, 2014
- Wigwag, 2001

== Nameplates ==
Parkinson designed and cleaned up numerous newspaper and magazine nameplates, making subtle adjustments to letterforms and character spacing to improve their appearance and legibility. Redesigned nameplates include The Washington Post, The Wall Street Journal, Houston Chronicle, New Zealand Herald, and Los Angeles Times daily newspapers; Rolling Stone, Esquire, Fast Company, and Newsweek magazines; The Daily Californian college newspaper at the University of California, Berkeley; and alternative weeklies Santa Cruz Weekly, North Bay Bohemian, and Pacific Sun.

== Publications ==
- “Creative Characters” Edited by Jan Middendorp, MyFonts. The Netherlands: BIS Publishers, 2010
- “Indie Fonts 2” Edited by Richard Kegler, James Greishaber and Tamye Riggs. Buffalo, N.Y: P-Type Publications, 2003
