= Paul Shaw (design historian) =

American graphic designer and historian

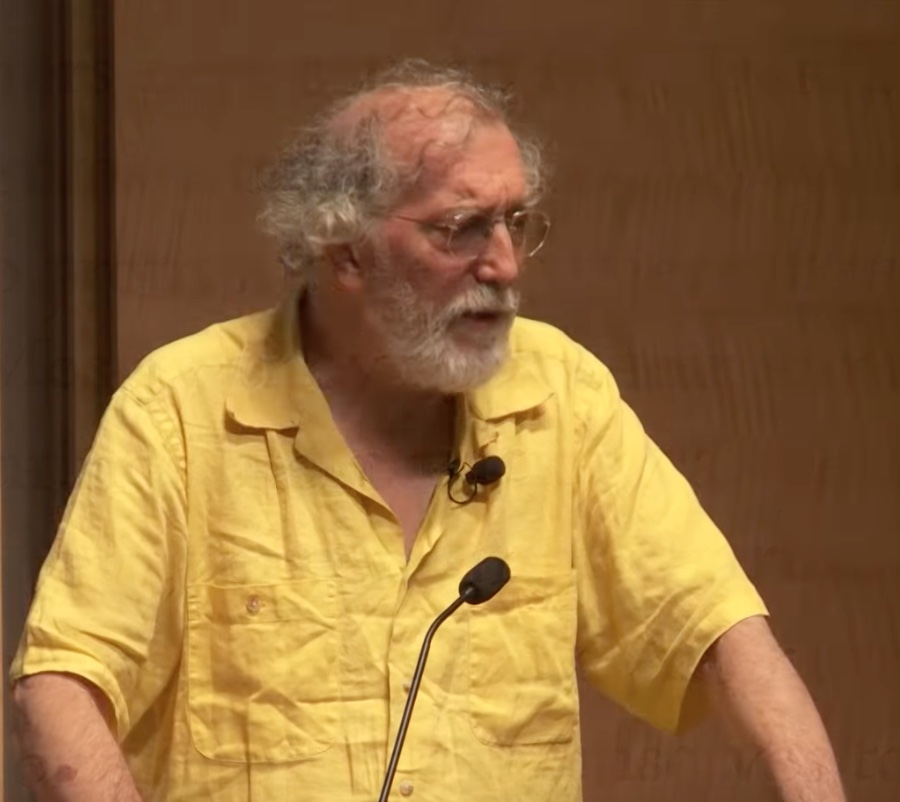
Paul Shaw in 2018

Paul Shaw (born 1954) is an American designer, calligrapher, and historian of design who lives in New York City. He has written a book on the history of the design of the New York City Subway system, Helvetica and the New York Subway System: The True (Maybe) Story, on the work of William Addison Dwiggins, and for Print magazine. His book on the New York subway is known as one of the best modern design books. He received the annual SoTA Typography Award of 2019. Shaw is Editor-in-Chief of Codex, Journal of Letterforms, and The Eternal Letter Design. His work has won awards from the AIGA Directors Club and the Art Directors Club of New York.

Shaw was born in 1954 in Ann Arbor, Michigan. He's a graduate of Columbia University Graduate School of Arts and Sciences.
