= Jan van Krimpen =

Dutch typographer and designer

Jan van Krimpen (12 January 1892, in Gouda – 20 October 1958, in Haarlem) was a Dutch typographer, book designer and type designer. He worked for the printing house Koninklijke Joh. Enschedé. He also worked with Monotype in England, that issued or reissued many of his designs outside the Netherlands.

Van Krimpen was a leading figure of international reputation in book printing during his lifetime. He designed books both in the Netherlands and for the Limited Editions Club of New York, amongst others. His work has been described as traditional and classical in style, focusing on simplicity and high quality of book printing.

== Personal life ==
Jan van Krimpen was born into a family of well-to-do Gouda merchants. Around 1910–1912, he followed courses at the Royal Academy of Art in The Hague. A visit to the Leipzig International Exhibition for Book Trade and Graphic Art (BuGra) (1914) awakened his taste for calligraphy, typography, bookbinding and type design. At first he tried to establish a bookbinding business, but soon he devoted himself to typography and publishing.

Van Krimpen married three times. His first marriage was in 1916 with Nini Brunt (1891–1984), the daughter of a The Hague bookseller, whom he divorced in 1929. Van Krimpen's only child was his son Huibrecht, usually known as Huib van Krimpen (1917–2002), himself a typographer and a prolific writer about typography.

== Type designs ==
Haarlemmer, a text typeface designed by Van Krimpen in 1938.

Spectrum, a text typeface designed by Van Krimpen between 1941 and 1943.

Van Krimpen's type designs are elegant book typefaces, originally made for manual printing and for the Monotype machine. Although a good few have been digitised (Romulus, Haarlemmer, Spectrum), the typefaces are only rarely used in publications. Van Krimpen was opposed to the idea of directly reviving type designs of the past, and his work is influenced by the structure of classical Roman square capitals in the upper case and chancery calligraphy of the Renaissance in italic. His approach of pursuing a personal path in type design was continued by Sem Hartz, his successor at Enschedé, and has been of interest to more recent Dutch designers such as Martin Majoor.

An extensive review of van Krimpen's work may be found in type designer Walter Tracy's Letters of Credit, a chapter of which assesses Van Krimpen's entire output. From his perspective as a designer who had worked on types for newspapers and small-size printing, Tracy felt that van Krimpen's love of classical letterforms made his work sometimes interesting but often impractical for general use: "a person of knowledge, ability, and taste... the empirical attitude and the practical method were not, it seems, Van Krimpen's way... he worked from an inner vision, not from a broad view of practical realities and requirements." Tracy considered Spectrum "crisp and positive" and "the most practical" of Van Krimpen's types. Van Krimpen had reservations about the quality of machine engraving of type punches and most of his designs were cut into metal by Enschedé's house punchcutter P.H. Rädisch, at least in the pilot sizes.

Normally a punchcutter like Rädisch would add some personal interpretation on the final result of the font. This was the fact with the first trial of the Lutetia-font. Van Krimpen did not accept this and insisted that all punches should be recut. Sem Hartz describes this as follows: "The designer, however, insisted on a recutting of the type, and although it certainly is flawless in its final form it has a slightly stilted look which is absent from its first form."

Of special note is the Romulus 'superfamily', consisting of a seriffed font, a sloped roman, a chancery italic (Cancelleresca Bastarda), a sans-serif, and a Greek in a range of weights. A type family this extensive would have been a first, comparable to today's Scala family by Majoor. The outbreak of the Second World War disrupted the project before completion. After the war, Van Krimpen was not interested in resuming it. The decision to use a sloped roman rather than a true italic was influenced by the theories of his friend Stanley Morison, who for a time suggested that italics were too disruptive to the flow of text and should be phased out except for decorative printing. Both Van Krimpen and Morison later moved away from this idea.

Van Krimpen was renowned for his perfectionism, but also for his temper. Monotype's archives preserve a letter to Stanley Morison which says "I do not want to be taken for the man who designed something so ridiculously poor as the sloped Romulus bold" that Monotype had produced without his involvement while Van Krimpen was trapped in the Netherlands during the war. Some of his papers are held by the University of Amsterdam.

== Foundry Type ==
Van Krimpen's Cancelleresca Bastarda typeface, in a text printed by Stanbrook Abbey.

These foundry types were designed by Jan van Krimpen:

- Lutetia (1925 Enschedé Foundry, 1928 Monotype)

Of this font, the first trial was made by Rädisch. The punches and matrices of the second version were controlled by van Krimpen. There were two sizes of Open Capitals. Van Krimpen started to alter 36pt and 48pt capitals taking some lead away from the surface. They were used as initials in printed texts by Enschedé. Later it was decided to make matrices for these variants, too.

In the summer of 1929 van Krimpen was visited by Porter Garnett, the owner of the Laboratory Press in Pittsburgh. Garnett was asked to print the Catalogue of the Frick Collection. He wanted to use the Lutetia, but asked for some changes. This led to a change in the following characters: C E F G L Q e h i j . , : ; ( ) - ` ' [ ]. Van Krimpen was quite pleased with the new version. But when Bert Clarke and David Way of Clarke & Way Inc., and The Thistle Press in New York around 1947 offered their version of the font for general use, Van Krimpen rejected the offer. The availability of an alternative version, in his eyes, would only lead to confusion.

- Romanée (1928–1949, Enschedé)
- Open Roman Capitals (1929, Enschedé)
- Romulus type family
  - Romulus (1931, Enschedé, also 1936 Monotype, sloped form is an oblique rather than a true italic)
  - Cancelleresca Bastarda (1934, Enschedé)
  - Romulus Sans (never released)
  - Romulus Greek
- Van Dijck Roman (1935, Monotype); based on types believed to have been cut by Christoffel van Dijck. Van Krimpen's level of involvement in this project was apparently mostly that of a consultant.
- Haarlemmer (1938, Monotype); release cancelled due to the war
- Sheldon (1947), designed for a Bible made by Oxford University Press and named for Archbishop Gilbert Sheldon.
- Spectrum (1952 Enschedé, also 1955 Monotype)

Some initials designed by van Krimpen for the Curwen Press have also been digitised by ARTypes of Chicago. ARTypes also digitised some sets of van Krimpen initial designs that are no longer on sale.

== See also ==
- A. A. M. Stols, a Dutch publisher for whom van Krimpen designed many books
