= Seravek =

Humanist sans-serif typeface

- Category: Sans-serif
- Classification: Humanist
- Designer: Eric Olson
- Foundry: Process Type Foundry
- Date created: 2007

Seravek is a sans-serif typeface family designed by Eric Olson and released in 2007. Olson described Seravek as having a neutral design of "near silence". Seravek is a member of the humanist style of sans-serifs, with features such as a true italic inspired by handwriting.

Sold commercially by the Process Type Foundry, Seravek is included as a system font in Apple's macOS operating system and as a default font in its Apple Books e-books application.
