= William Addison Dwiggins =

American type designer (1880–1956)

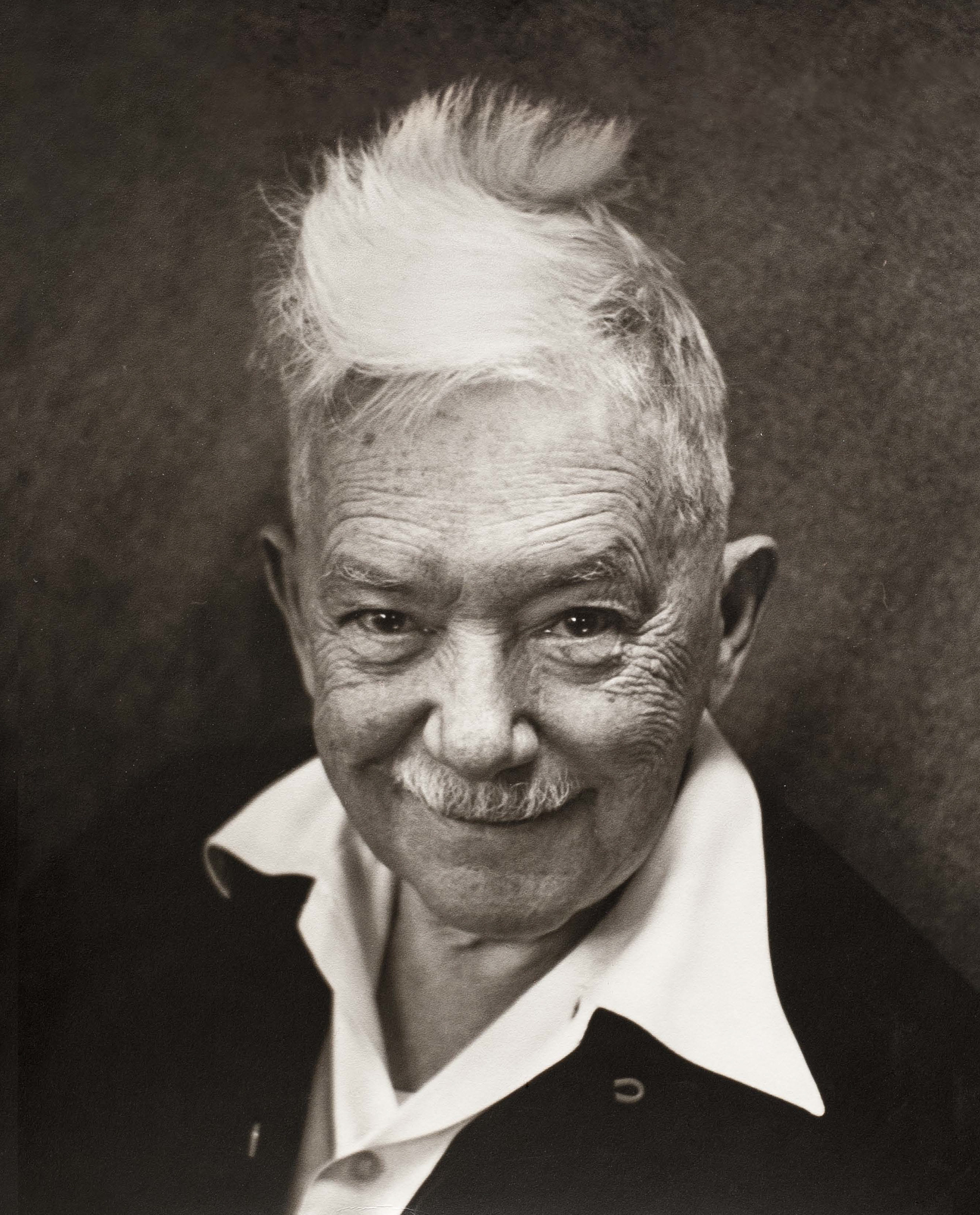
- Dwiggins in 1953
- Born: June 19, 1880; Martinsville, Ohio, US
- Died: December 25, 1956 (aged 76); Hingham, Massachusetts, US
- Occupations: Type designer, calligrapher, book designer
- Spouse: Mabel Hoyle Dwiggins

William Addison Dwiggins (June 19, 1880 – December 25, 1956) was an American type designer, calligrapher, and book designer. He attained prominence as an illustrator and commercial artist, and he brought to the designing of type and books some of the boldness that he displayed in his advertising work.

His work can be described as ornamented and geometric, similar to the Art Moderne and Art Deco styles of the period, using Oriental influences and breaking from the more antiquarian styles of his colleagues and mentors Updike, Cleland and Goudy.

== Career ==
Dwiggins began his career in Chicago, working in advertising and lettering. With his colleague Frederic Goudy, he moved east to Hingham, Massachusetts, where he spent the rest of his life. He gained recognition as a lettering artist and wrote much on the graphic arts, notably essays collected in MSS by WAD (1949), and his Layout in Advertising (1928; rev. ed. 1949) remains standard. During the first half of the twentieth century he also created pamphlets using the pen name "Dr. Hermann Puterschein".

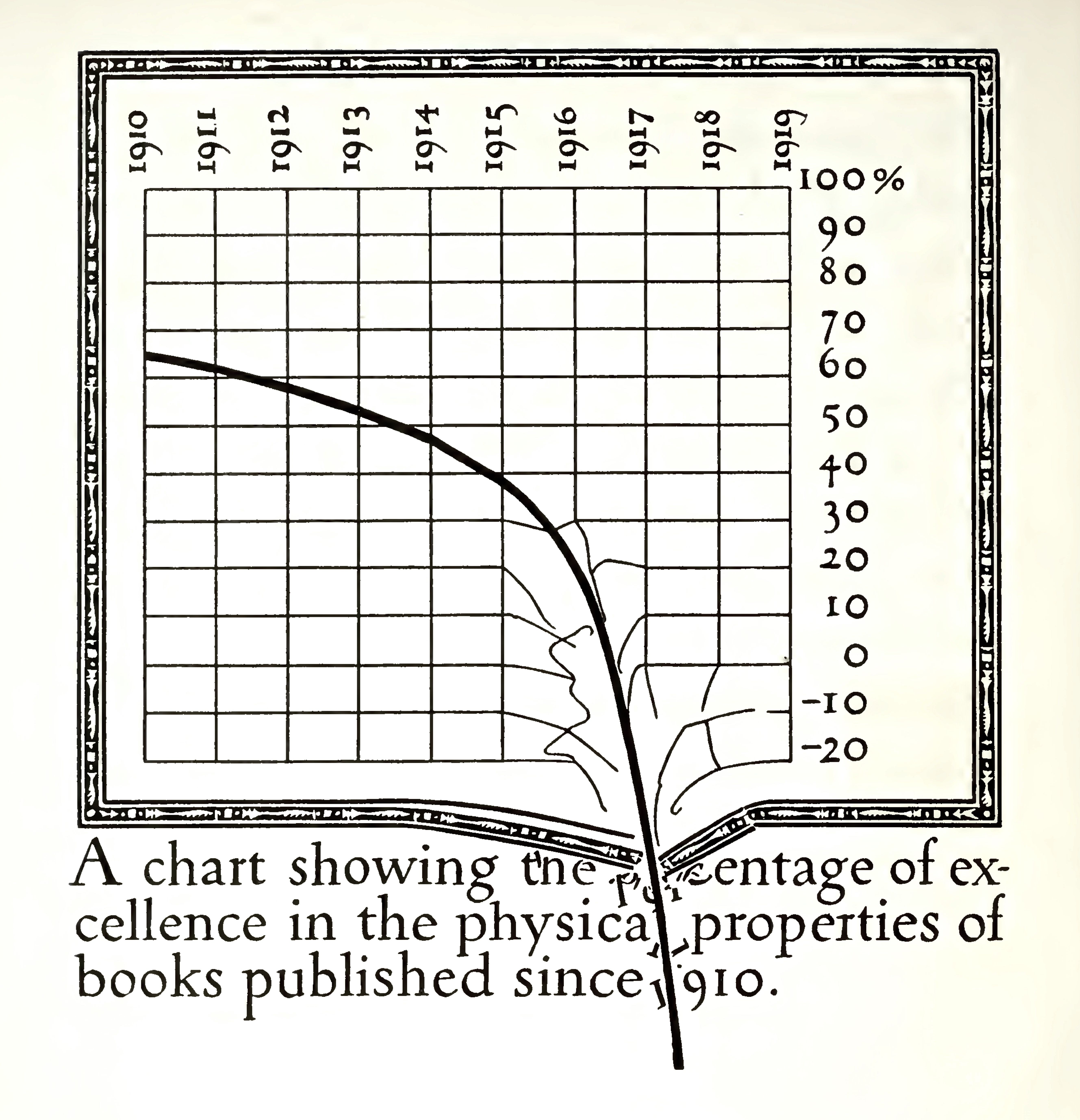
Dwiggins' commentary on what he saw as declining standards in book design, 1919

His scathing attack on contemporary book designers in An Investigation into the Physical Properties of Books (1919) led to his working with the publisher Alfred A. Knopf. Alblabooks, a series of finely conceived and executed trade books followed and did much to increase public interest in book format. Having become bored with advertising work, Dwiggins was perhaps more responsible than any other designer for the marked improvement in book design in the 1920s and 1930s. An additional factor in his transition to book design was a 1922 diagnosis with diabetes, at the time often fatal. He commented "it has revolutionised my whole attack. My back is turned on the more banal kind of advertising...I will produce art on paper and wood after my own heart with no heed to any market."

In 1926, the Chicago Lakeside Press recruited Dwiggins to design a book for the Four American Books Campaign. He said he welcomed the chance to "do something besides waste-basket stuff" which would be "promptly thrown away" and chose the Tales of Edgar Allan Poe. The Press considered his fee of $2,000 to be low for an illustrator of his commercial power. Many of Dwiggins' designs used celluloid stencils to create repeating units of decoration.

In 1947, he formed the Püterschein-Hingham private press with Dorothy Abbe. They produced fourteen books, including the children's books Animalore and Mouse Musings, designed by Abbe. Their final book was Prelude to Eden, A Drama for Marionettes, the first book bound in aluminum sheets in the U.S.

He and his wife Mabel Hoyle Dwiggins (February 27, 1881 – September 28, 1958) are buried in the Hingham Center Cemetery, Hingham Center, Massachusetts, near their home at 30 Leavitt Street, and Dwiggins' studio at 45 Irving Street. After Dwiggins' wife's death, many of Dwiggins' works and assets passed to his assistant Dorothy Abbe.

A full-length biography of Dwiggins by Bruce Kennett, believed to be the first, was published in 2018 by the Letterform Archive museum of San Francisco.

== Typefaces ==
Dwiggins' interest in lettering led to the Mergenthaler Linotype Company, sensing Dwiggins' talent and knowledge, hiring Dwiggins in March 1929 as a consultant to create a sans-serif typeface, which became Metro, in response to similar type being sold from European foundries such as Erbar, Futura, and Gill Sans, which Dwiggins felt failed in the lower-case. Dwiggins went on to have a successful working relationship with Chauncey H. Griffith, Linotype's Director of Typographic Development, and all his typefaces were created for them. His most widely used book typefaces, Electra and Caledonia, were specifically designed for Linotype composition and have a clean spareness.

The following list of his typefaces is thought to be complete. Dwiggins had the misfortune of entering the field of type design during a period that encompassed, successively, the Great Depression and the Second World War, and as a result, many of his designs did not progress beyond experimental castings. Several of his typefaces saw commercial release only after his death, or, while not released themselves, have been used as inspiration for other designers.

- Metro series
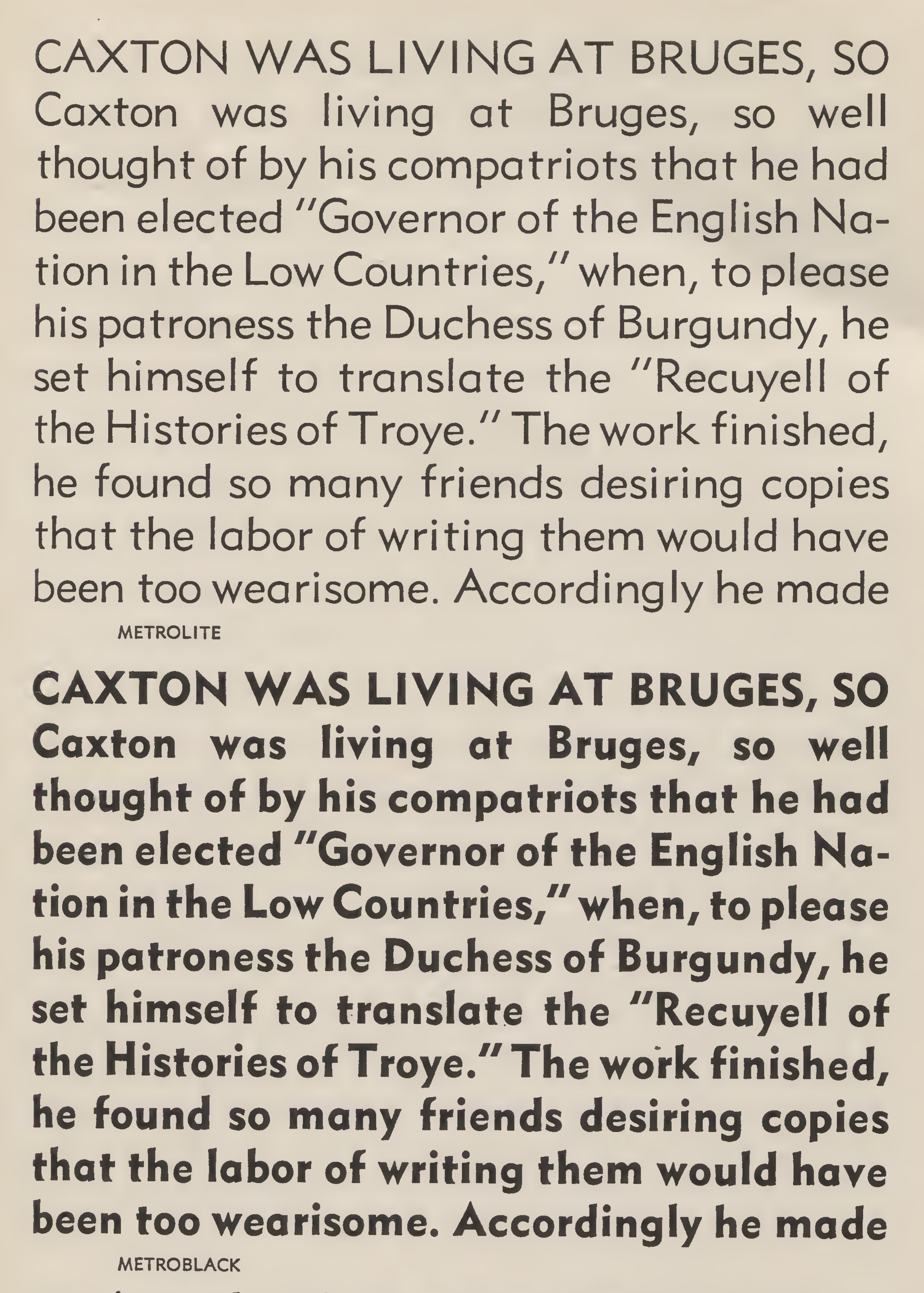
  Dwiggins' Metrolite and Metroblack fonts, geometric designs of the style popular in the 1930s. Shown in a Linotype specimen in the revised form that saw commercial release, with the 'M', 'a' and other characters revised to resemble the highly successful Futura.
  - Metrolite + Metroblack (1930, Linotype)
  - Metrothin + Metromedium (1931, Linotype)
  - Metrolite No.2 + Metroblack No.2 (1932, Linotype)
  - Metrolite No.2 Italic + Lining Metrothin + Lining Metromedium (1935, Linotype)
  - Metromedium No.2 Italic + Metroblack No.2 Italic (1937, Linotype)
  - Metrolight No.4 Italic + Metrothin No.4 Italic (Linotype)

The Metro series was redesigned on entering production, with several characters changed to better echo the then-popular Futura. This formed the Metro No. 2 series. Some revivals return to Dwiggins' original design choices or offer them as alternates.

- Electra series
  - Electra + Electra Oblique (italic) (1935, Linotype)
  - Electra Bold + Italic (Linotype)
  - Electra Cursive (1940, Linotype, a true italic for Electra)
  - Matching ornaments, sometimes called the Caravan series (Linotype)
- Charter (Designed 1937–42, used only for one book, never released, Linotype)
- Hingham (Designed 1937–43, cut in 7 pt. but not released, Linotype)
- Caledonia series
  - Caledonia + Italic (1938, Linotype)
  - Caledonia Bold + Italic (1940, Linotype)
- Arcadia (Designed 1943–47, used only for Typophile's Chapbook XXII, never released, Linotype)
- Tippecanoe + Italic (Designed 1944–46, used only for The Creaking Stair by Elizabeth Coatsworth, never released, Linotype), Dwiggins's take on Bodoni
- Winchester Roman + Italic + Winchester Uncials + Italic (1944–48, hand-cast by Dwiggins, not released by Linotype; the Roman was later digitized as ITC New Winchester)
- Stuyvesant + Italic (c.1949, used for only a few books, Linotype, never released), based on type cut by Jacques-François Rosart in Holland c.1750.
- Eldorado + Italic (1950, Linotype; revived by Font Bureau in the 1990s in three optical sizes), based on types cut by Jacques de Sanlecque the Elder used by Antonio de Sancha
- Falcon + Italic (developed 1944 / released 1961, Linotype), a "sharp-finished old-style" serif book typeface
- Experimental 63 (c. 1929–32, never released), a humanist modulated sans-serif prefiguring Optima by 25 years, unknown to Zapf before 1969
- Experimental 267D (not released), intended as an answer to Monotype’s Times New Roman, but ultimately abandoned in favor of licensing Times itself.

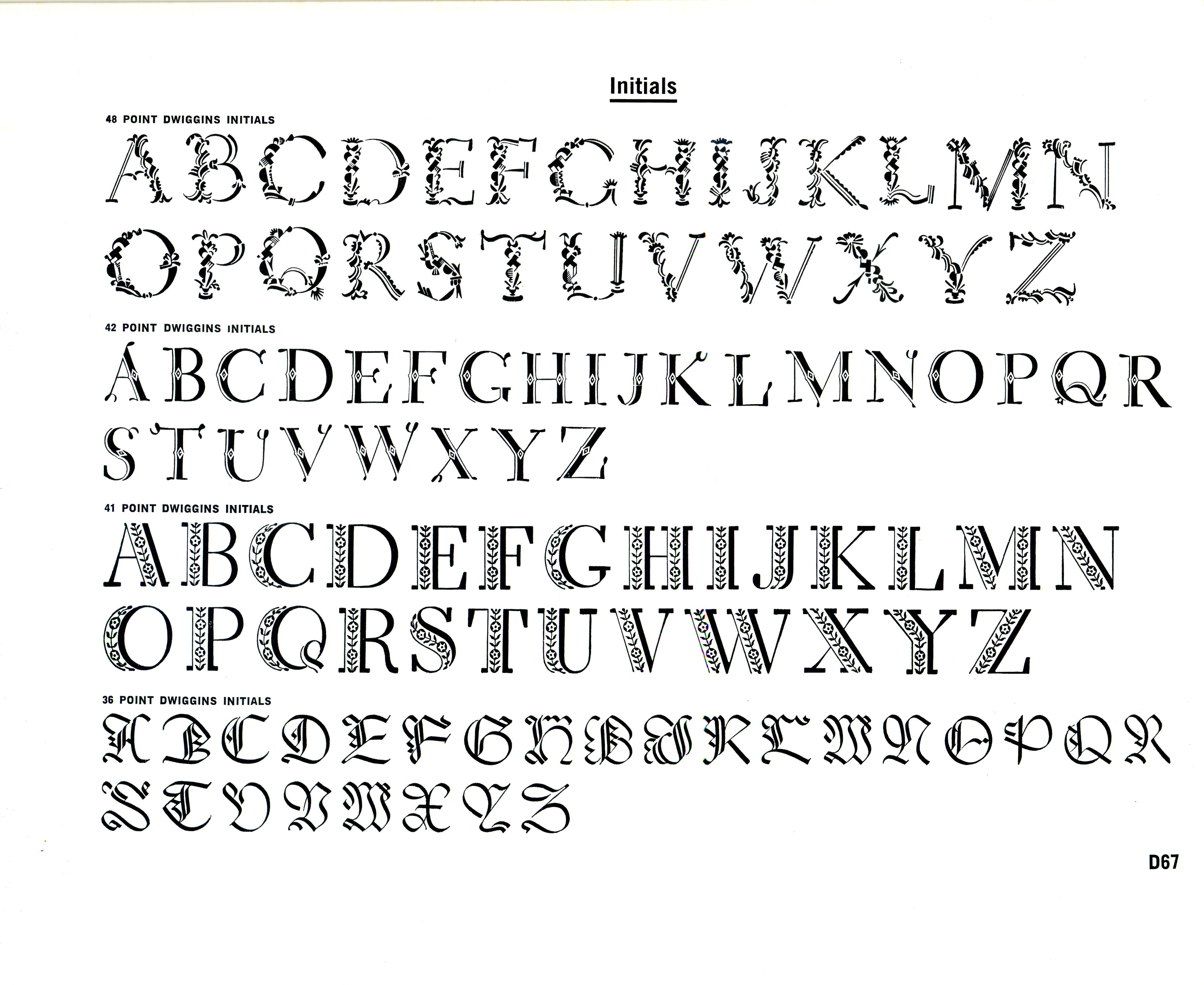
A set of initials designed by Dwiggins for the Plimpton Press.

Other fonts, inspired by his various lettering projects, have been created after his death, although these were not authorised by Dwiggins in his lifetime:

- Dossier (2020, by Toshi Omagari for his Tabular Type Foundry; based on several unfinished typewriter font designs for Underwood, Remington and IBM)
- Dwiggins Deco (2009, by Matt Desmond for MadType; based on a modular alphabet of geometric shapes made by Dwiggins in 1930 for American Alphabets by Paul Hollister)
- P22 Dwiggins Uncial (2001, by Richard Kegler for International House of Fonts; based on uncial calligraphy by Dwiggins for a 1935 short story)
- P22 Dwiggins Extras (2001, by Richard Kegler for International House of Fonts; a set of decorations based on stencil and woodblock designs used by Dwiggins)
- Dwiggins 48 (a digitized set of initial capitals originally created by Dwiggins at 48-point size for the Plimpton Press)
- Mon Nicolette (2020, by Cristóbal Henestrosa and Oscar Yáñez for Sudtipos; a significantly expanded revival of Charter in two optical sizes, complete with cursive capitals based on sketches by Dwiggins and a font of “Tuscan” initials like those accompanying Charter in printed proofs)
- Marionette (2021, by Nick Sherman for HEX; based on sketches from 1937 illustrating Dwiggins's “M-Formula”)

A trick used by Dwiggins to create dynamic-looking letter shapes was to design letters so the curves on the inside of the letter do not match those on the outside, creating abrupt changes in curves. This intentional irregularity was inspired by the difficulty of carving marionettes for his puppet theatre. It has since been used by other serif font designers such as Martin Majoor and Cyrus Highsmith. Jonathan Hoefler comments on Hingham that it contains “many unusual things”: “that lower-case ‘o’ that's heaviest at the upper-left corner is just kind of mystifying, or the lower-case ‘e’ that's thinnest at the lower-left corner”.

Besides Dwiggins' type design, a text written by Dwiggins in Layout in Advertising on choosing a font, beginning "Why do the pace-makers in the art of printing rave over a specific face of type? What do they see in it?", has been used by many font designers as a filler text, similar to Quousque tandem or lorem ipsum.

== Marionettes ==
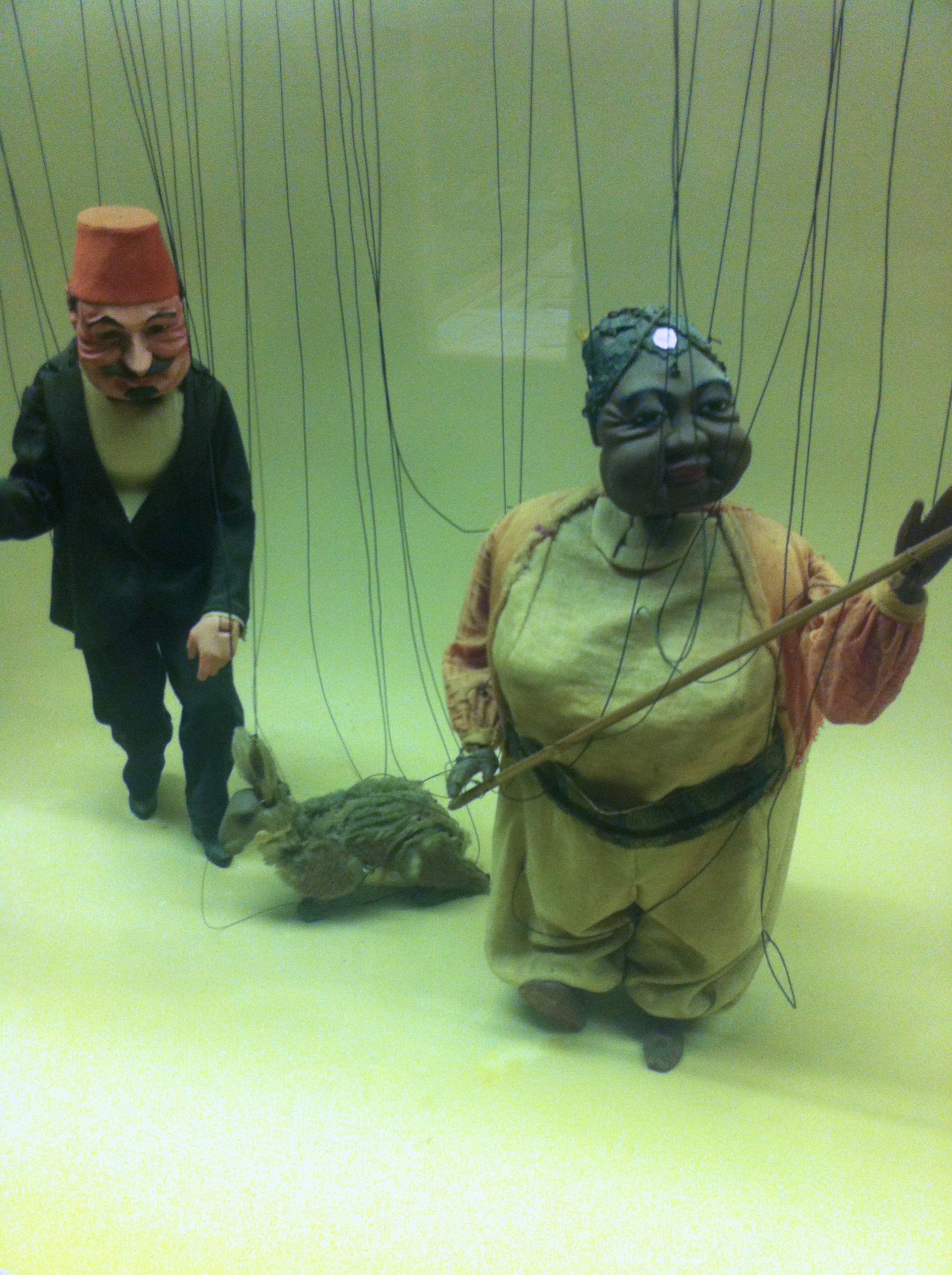

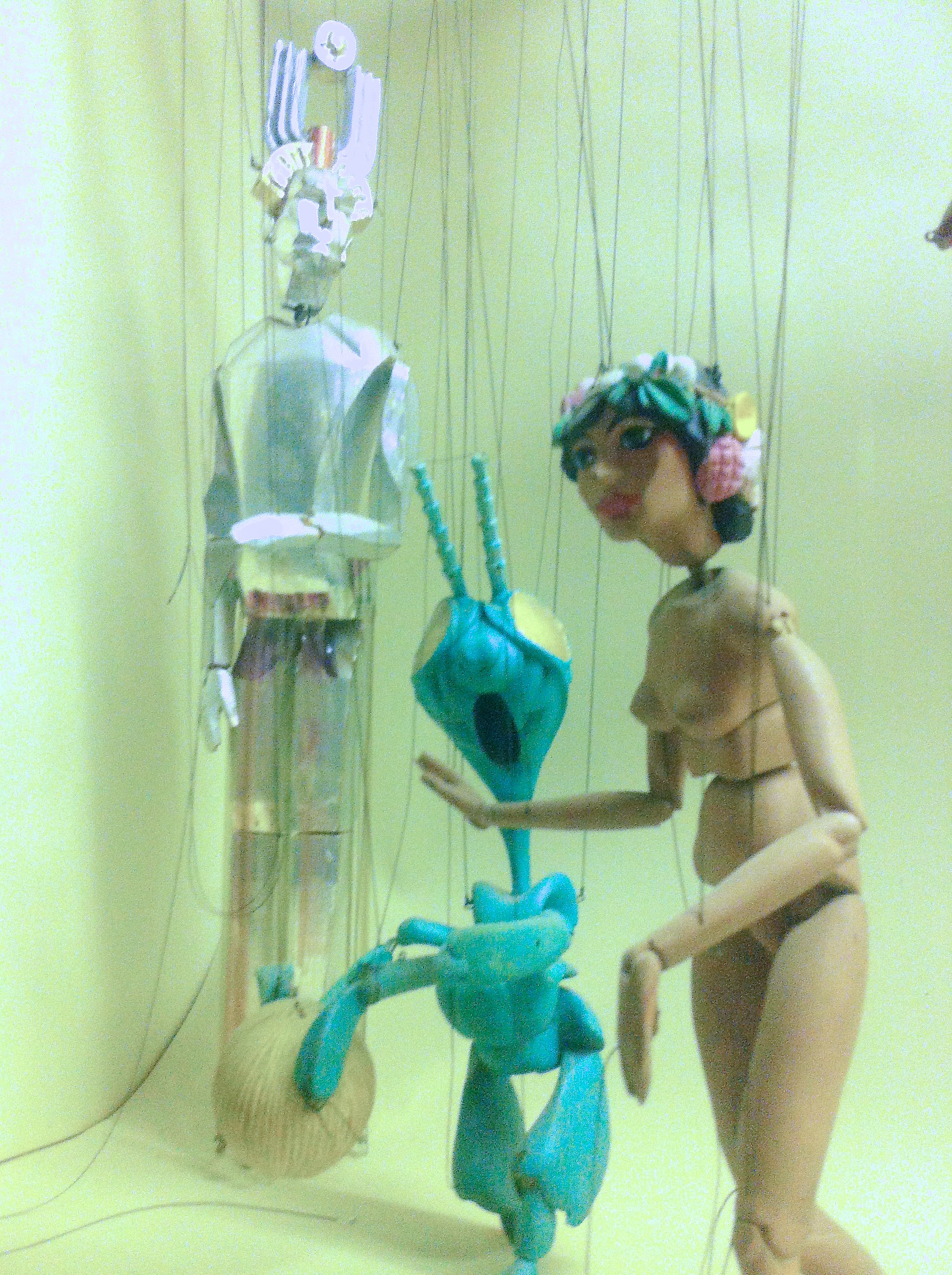
Marionettes by Dwiggins at the Boston Public Library

Dwiggins' love of wood carving led to his creation of a marionette theatre in a garage at 5 Irving Street, which was behind his home at 30 Leavitt Street in Hingham, Massachusetts. He also created a puppet group named the Püterschein Authority. In 1933 he performed his first show there, "The Mystery of the Blind Beggarman." Dwiggins built his second theatre under his studio at 45 Irving Street. Further productions of the Püterschein Authority included "Prelude to Eden," "Brother Jeromy," "Millennium 1," and "The Princess Primrose of Shahaban in Persia." Most of his marionettes were twelve inches tall. The marionettes were donated to the three-room Dwiggins Collection at the Boston Public Library in 1967.

== Legacy ==
In 1957, a year after his death, Bookbuilders of Boston, an organization of book publishing professionals that Dwiggins helped to establish, renamed their highest award the W.A. Dwiggins Award.

Dwiggins has sometimes been credited with introducing the term "graphic design" in a 1922 article, but the term was being used before this.

== Bibliography ==
- La Dernière Mobilisation (1915). Story in The Fabulist and in The Best Short Stories of 1915.
- An Investigation into the Physical Properties of Books (1919)
- Layout in Advertising (1928)
- Towards a Reform of the Paper Currency, Particularly in Point of its Design (The Limited Editions Club, 1932)
- Form Letters: Illustrator to Author (William Edwin Rudge, 1930)
- The Power of Print—and Men (1936), with Thomas Dreier
- Marionette in motion; the Püterschein system diagrammed, described (1939)
- WAD to RR: A Letter about Designing Type (1940)
- Millennium 1 (Alfred A. Knopf, 1945)

== Books illustrated or designed ==
- The Witch Wolf: An Uncle Remus Story, Joel Chandler Harris (Bacon & Brown, 1921)
- A History of Russian Literature, from the Earliest Times to the Death of Dostoyevsky, Prince D.S. Mirsky (Alfred A. Knopf, 1927)
- The Complete Angler, Izaak Walton (Merrymount Press, 1928)
- Paraphs, Hermann Püterschein (Alfred A Knopf for the Society of Calligraphers, 1928)
- Beau Brummell, Virginia Woolf (Rimington & Hooper, 1930)
- The Time Machine: An Invention, H. G. Wells (Random House, 1931)
- The Lone Striker, Robert Frost (Alfred A. Knopf, 1933)
- Hingham, Old and New, (Hingham Tercentenary Committee, 1935)
- One More Spring, Robert Nathan, The Overbrook Press, 1935)
- Gargantua & Pentagruel, Francois Rabelais (The Limited Editions Club,1936)
- Thomas Mann: Stories of Three Decades (Alfred A. Knopf, 1936)
- The Power of Print–and Men, by Thomas Dreier (Mergenthaler Linotype Co., 1936)
- Theme and Variations, an autobiography by Bruno Walter (Alfred A. Knopf, 1947)
- William Addison Dwiggins: Stencilled Ornament and Illustration (By Dorothy Abbe), Princeton Architectural Press, 2015 (ISBN 978-1616893750)

Conrad Richter: The Trees, Borzoi Books, by Alfred A Knopf, 1940
