= Vincent Figgins =

British typefounder (1766–1844)

- Signature of Vincent Figgins, 1793
- Born: 1766
- Died: 29 February 1844 (aged 77–78); Peckham Rye, England
- Resting place: Nunhead Cemetery
- Occupations: Typefounder, Councilman of the City of London
- Spouse: Elizabeth
- Children: 6, including James

Vincent Figgins (1766 – 29 February 1844) was a British typefounder based in London, who cast and sold metal type for printing. After an apprenticeship with typefounder Joseph Jackson, he established his own type foundry in 1792. His company was extremely successful and, with its range of modern serif faces and display typefaces, had a strong influence on the styles of British printing in the nineteenth century. A successor company continued to make type until the 1970s.

Figgins introduced or popularised both slab-serif and sans-serif typefaces, which have since become two of the main genres of typeface. He was also involved in local politics as a Councilman of the City of London.

== Family and early life ==
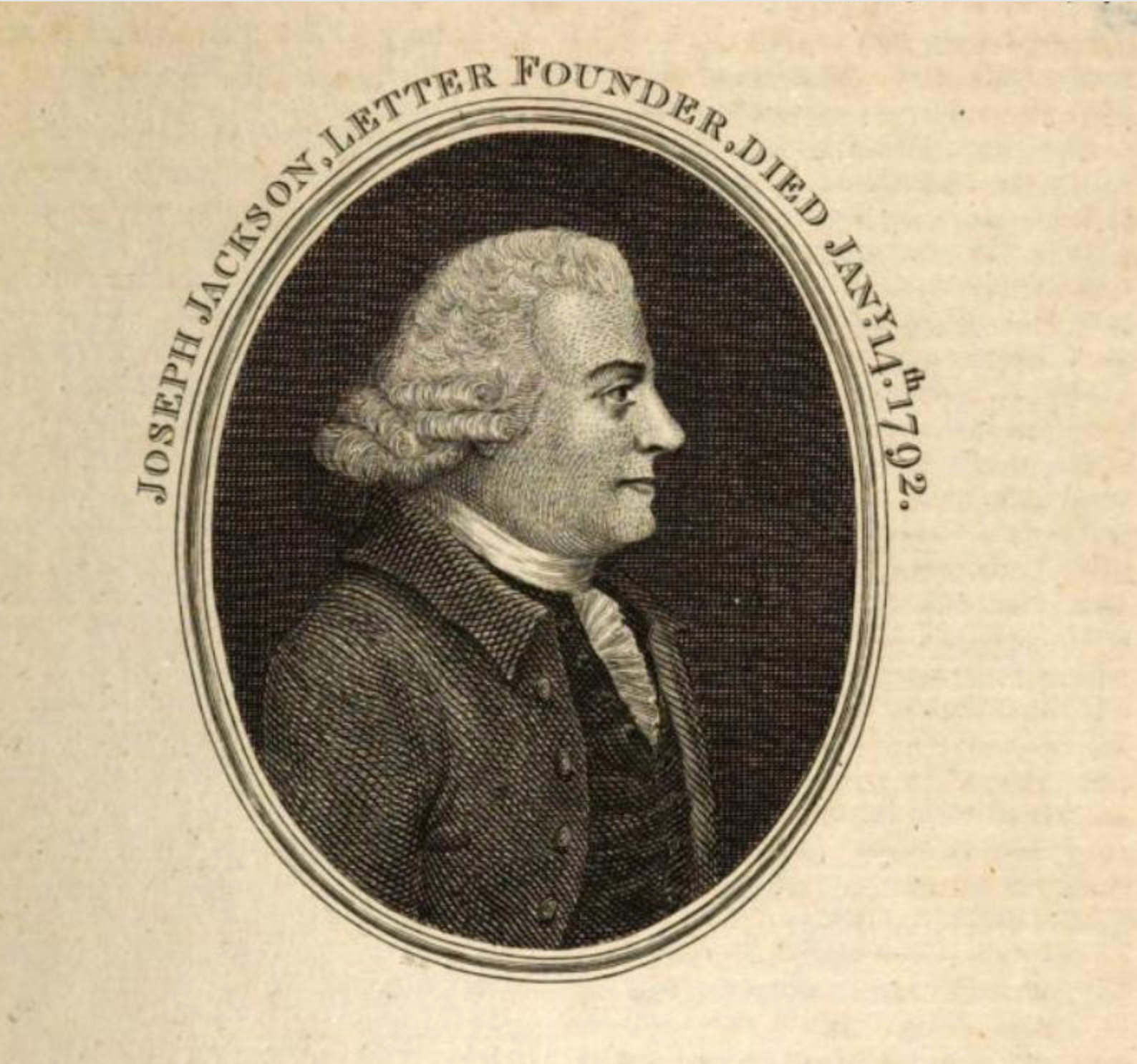
Engraved portrait of Joseph Jackson, Figgins' master during his apprenticeship. (Note: The lettering is part of the engraving and not a typeface.)

The son of a bookkeeper, Figgins was born in 1766 and started his career as an apprentice to the typefounder Joseph Jackson. He worked for Jackson from 1782 until Jackson's death in 1792. According to Talbot Baines Reed, Figgins was largely the manager of Jackson's foundry from about 1790 onwards due to Jackson's poor health.

His wife was Elizabeth and he had sons Vincent, James, later an alderman and MP, Henry and four daughters.

== Career ==
The main historical sources for Figgins' career are:

- the specimens he issued of the typefaces that he sold, which were first sheets and later books as his business expanded.
- Literary Anecdotes of the Eighteenth Century (1812), by his friend and patron the antiquarian and printer John Nichols
- Thomas Curson Hansard's textbook on printing Typographia (1825), published towards the end of Figgins' career
- A History of The Old English Letter Foundries by Talbot Baines Reed (1887), who knew Figgins' grandson (Note: This book was later republished in 1952 edited with additional material by Alfred F. Johnson, but this material is often silently added into Reed's text without explanation. Mosley writes that it "is (notwithstanding its many virtues) something of an editorial disaster" and recommends that readers read Johnson's and Reed's editions side-by-side. The section on Figgins is mostly unchanged apart from an updating of the story beyond Reed's time at the end.)

On Jackson's death, Figgins wanted to take the foundry over but could not afford to; it was instead purchased by William Caslon III. A member of the prominent Caslon typefounding family, he was seeking to set up a foundry independent of the Caslon foundry established by his grandfather William Caslon I. (Soon after taking over the Jackson foundry Caslon went bankrupt, although he was apparently able to rebuild the business until his retirement in 1807.)

John Nichols, who believed in Figgins' talent, encouraged Figgins to open his own foundry.

Figgins would many years later write to Nichols to thank him for his generosity during the beginning of his career:

I am greatly obliged to you for the very flattering mention of my name, but you have not done yourself the justice to record your own kindness to me: that, on Mr. Jackson's death, finding I had not the means to purchase the foundry, you encouraged me to make a beginning. You gave me large orders and assisted me with the means of executing them; and during a long and difficult struggle in pecuniary matters for fifteen years, you, my dear Sir, never refused me your assistance, without which I must have given it up. Do mention this—that, as the first Mr. Bowyer was the means of establishing Mr. Caslon—his son, Mr. Jackson—it may be known that Vincent Figgins owes his prosperity to Mr. Bowyer's successor.

Figgins' foundry was established at White Swan Yard, Holborn, moving in 1801 to West Street, Smithfield. (Both streets have been completely demolished because of urban redevelopment around the late nineteenth century, for Holborn Viaduct and Charterhouse Street respectively.) He was also commissioned by Oxford University Press (OUP) for work such as carefully repairing matrices for a sixteenth-century Greek typeface.

An early commission was to make a facsimile type for Macklin's Bible, commissioned by Thomas Bensley. The original type for the book was cut by Jackson, and Bensley decided to buy new type which matched the original. Instead of going to Caslon, who had Jackson's matrices, he asked Figgins. Figgins was able to make a perfect recreation of the type. He then worked on a similar job to finish the Double Pica (22-point size) type in Robert Bowyer’s edition of David Hume's The History of England which was being worked on by Jackson at the time of his death. Another early client was the luxury printer Peltro William Tomkins. In 1793, Figgins was one of the major type founders in London who formed an association with the goal of functioning as a cartel for price fixing.

Figgins' company issued specimens of his types from 1793, first as sheets and later in book form. Examination of watermarks indicates that Figgins continued to use a dated title page for some years while changing the content of the book, so these were often later than the title page date. His sons also issued a specimen in 1838, soon after taking over management on Figgins' retirement, and in 1845. Berthold Wolpe edited a reprint of his 1801 and 1815 specimens published by the Printing Historical Society. (Note: Wolpe had bought the specimens from the successor to Figgins' foundry, Stevens Shanks, around 1949 (see below), when it was in financial difficulties.)

According to Nichols' son John Bowyer Nichols, Figgins was "an amiable and worthy man, and was generally respected."

=== Employees ===
Perhaps the strangest aspect of Figgins' career was its beginning, in which one of his tasks was to finish a Greek type begun by Jackson for Oxford University Press. Typefaces at this time were made by cutting the letterforms to be printed as steel punches. This was done by a punchcutter, a skilled engraver. Vincent Figgins II in 1855 wrote that his father's career began in this way:

The mystery thrown over the operations of a Type-foundry, within my own recollection (thirty-four years), and the still greater secrecy which had existed in my father's experience, testifies that the art had been perpetuated by a kind of Druidic or Masonic induction from the first. An anecdote of my father's early struggles may illustrate this. At the death of Mr. Joseph Jackson, whom my father had served ten years as apprentice and foreman, there was in progress for the University Press of Oxford a new fount of Double Pica [22-point size] Greek, which had progressed under my father's entire management. The then delegates of that Press – the Rev. Dr. Randolph and the Rev. W. Jackson – suggested that Mr Figgins should finish the fount himself. This, with other offers of support from those who had previously known him, was the germ of his prosperity (which was always gratefully acknowledged). But when he had undertaken this work, the difficulty presented itself that he did not know where to find the punch-cutter. No one knew his address; but he was supposed to be a tall man, who came in a mysterious way occasionally, whose name no one knew, but he went by the sobriquet of 'The Black Man'. This old gentleman, a very clever mechanic, lived to be a pensioner on my father's bounty—gratitude is perhaps the better word. I knew him and could never understand the origin of his sobriquet, unless Black was meant for dark, mysterious, from the manner of his coming and going from Mr. Jackson's foundry.

Wolpe investigated the topic of Figgins' punchcutters in the 1960s, finding that the Stephenson Blake foundry of Sheffield had a copy of his c. 1815 specimen with annotations noting the cutters of some types in pencil, suggesting that Figgins often commissioned work from two punchcutters about whom little is known named Perry and Edmonston. Wolpe noted that a Perry also cut a type for the Caslon foundry and suggested that Edmonston, who lived at Alfred Place, Cambridge Heath, is the same man as the punchcutter recorded as Edmiston who cut an extremely small 4.5pt Greek type for the Caslon foundry, known from 1828, according to Bowman "so small that its clarity is remarkable". Wolpe concluded, however, that "who the mysterious 'Black Man'...was, we may never be able to find out." (Note: 'Black' should not be taken to mean people of African ancestry: Vincent Figgins II explicitly stated that he did not know why the man was called "the black man". The term "black" only became the norm for people of African ancestry during the civil rights movement around the 1960s, for instance Black power and Black is beautiful.)

John H. Bowman in his research on the history of printing Greek in Britain concluded that Figgins' account did not match Figgins or OUP's known Greek types: "I have not found anything answering its description. It may be that it is a mistake [for another, Great Primer or 18pt, font] or indeed perhaps the difficulties of finding "the Black Man" were such that the type was never completed. I do not believe it can be the Double Pica that appears in Figgins' later specimens [see below], for the style of that type would have been impossible at this early date."

A Charles Perry is documented in news articles of the late 1820s as a punchcutter for Figgins. His career was halted by tragedy: on 6 December 1829, drunk and arguing with his common-law wife, he threw an iron at her and hit their son who was in his mother's arms, breaking his son's skull and killing him. (Note: Reports of the inquest reported his real name, or at least past alias, was Wilbraham, but he had been known as Perry for the last seven years "in consequence of having left his employment, and engaged with Mr. Figgins...in whose employ he has of late years been", The court record gave his age as 33, so he may not be the same Perry that Figgins employed in the 1810s. According to one report Perry "was able to obtain at his trade between four and five pounds a week; and he was allowed to be one of the most clever workmen in his line of business. He was considered a most harmless, inoffensive man, but was in the habit of drinking to excess." However, he had apparently been charged that September with attacking Matthew Williams, the landlord of the Coopers' Arms in West Street, where he lived and where the foundry was, as well as Williams' wife; the report claimed that he "gave her a violent blow just above her right eye, which cut open the flesh" and that Williams "either from a kick, or from falling on the prisoner's knee...had received such severe internal injury, that he was unable to leave his bed for four days, and now could scarcely stand". He also had been drinking at the Coopers' Arms before the tragedy of that December.) He received a year's imprisonment.

During a court case involving a theft in 1821, an employee of Figgins reported that "we have from twenty to thirty workmen."

== Politics ==
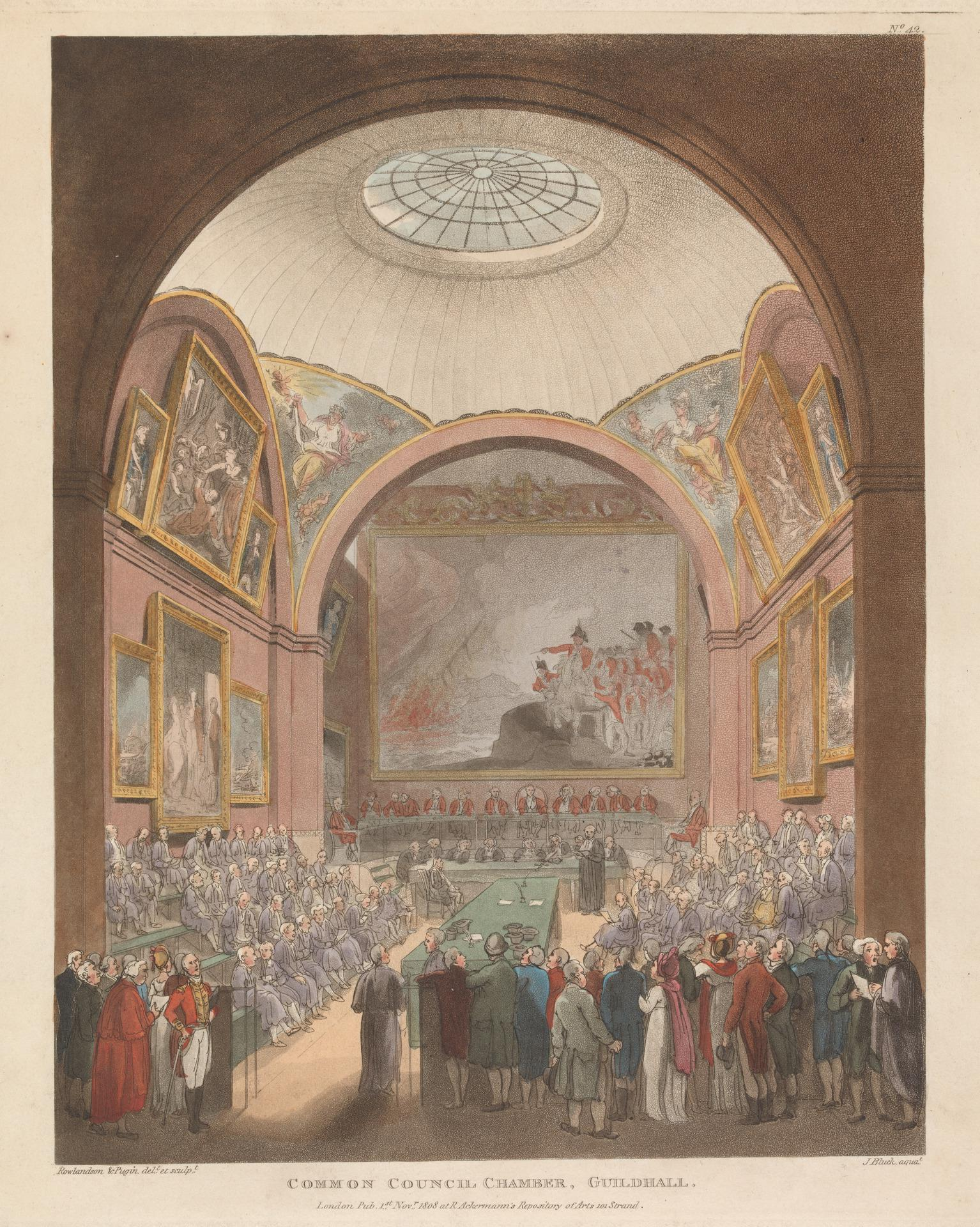
The Common Council Chamber at the Guildhall, pictured in 1808

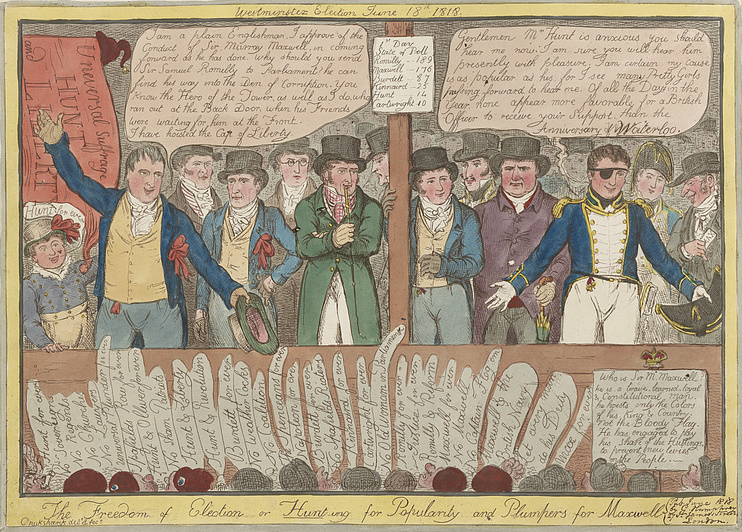
Radical candidate Henry Hunt (speaking, left) in an 1818 cartoon. Ten years later he unsuccessfully ran against Figgins for election. Figgins described him as a "shameless fellow".

Besides his business career, Figgins was a Common Councilman for the ward of Farringdon Without of the City of London.

In 1828 the Radical candidate Henry Hunt and journalist William Cobbett ran in a heavily publicised campaign in the multi-candidate seat of Farringdon Without (the top sixteen candidates were to be elected), running on a campaign of investigating how the City's funds were used. Cobbett's Political Register reported a rowdy meeting on 26 December 1828 which degenerated into arguments, stating that Hunt, after first conceding that rumours that he had left his wife for another woman were true, said (speech is reported):

His opponent, Mr Figgins [visited pot-houses where] it was a constant practice to sing songs of the most beastly and indecent description...songs that would almost make humanity shudder and yet these songs were allowed and applauded, and his opponent, Mr. Figgins, sat and laughed at them until his old rotten teeth almost dropped out of his head. He [Mr. Hunt] had heard that songs were sung at these houses that would not be tolerated by the lowest prostitutes that visited the Finish...
[In response] Mr. Figgins never appeared before them with so much pleasure. It was an honour to him to have the abuse of this shameless fellow. (Loud murmuring and hisses.) After some considerable time, he proceeded, and accused Mr. Hunt of having turned away his own wife, and of having seduced the wife of Colonel Vince.–(Cries of "Off, off!") Mr. Hunt was infirm in talent as in virtue, and would they think of sending a detestable adulterer to represent them?...
Mr. Hunt [said that] as to Mr. Figgins' attack regarding the female alluded to, it was a mere cowardly attack on a woman.
Mr. Figgins asked if it were not true!
Mr. Hunt replied that such a question was never put in any other Court than the Spanish Inquisition. As to Mr. Figgins ever being guilty of such an offence–why no man would ever suspect him; the very appearance of the man was a denial to the charge.

The article reported that "a good deal more personal altercation" followed. (Note: An anthology of materials about the election (discussed below) includes a different and more extensive transcript of the proceedings; it does not give a source.)

Ultimately Cobbett withdrew before the election and Hunt lost; Cobbett's contemporary biographer Robert Huish claimed that "from the beginning of the meeting to the end it was one tissue of abuse uttered against Hunt and Cobbett [while Figgins and his allies] received from the two sturdy radicals some heavy blows...it is scarcely necessary to remark that neither of the radicals was successful...Mr. Hunt soon saw that he was no great favourite with the good people of that part of the city." (Note: Huish also wrote that the accusations about Hunt's marriage were correct, although Hunt's later biographer John Belchem wrote that the Vinces' marriage was unhappy before she began her relationship with Hunt, who was "devoted" to her.) Figgins came eighth in the poll and was one of the sixteen elected out of eighteen candidates; Hunt came last. Hunt's campaign attracted considerable attention, and a book was published the following year anthologising the events of the campaign "which has excited considerable interest in the public mind of the City."

Figgins also reportedly advised in a meeting of 4 October 1827 against sending nightwatchmen out on patrol and supported the traditional approach that they waited in watchboxes, because (speech again reported):

if the watchman goes to sleep in his box, when you want him you know where to find him, but on the altered plan proposed, in case of an accident, there would be to seek him through half the public-houses in the ward

In 1829 William Heath published a cartoon, "The charleys [nightwatchmen] in grief or the funeral of the city watch boxe's" showing a procession of nightwatchmen protesting against the change with a banner of "Figgins for ever".

== Typefaces ==
Under the pyrotechnics of Figgins' display faces, his body text faces, the types he first sold, have received less attention. His earliest faces, some being copies of earlier designs, are in the late "transitional" style, with affinities to faces such as Caslon, Baskerville and its copy by the Fry Foundry, Bulmer and Bell. Nicolas Barker felt that Figgins' early types "constitute the largest and best of the 'transitional' group, in which the genius of Bodoni was most effectively translated into English." His later text faces are very clearly in the modern or Didone style, which became popular around the close of the eighteenth century. It has a sharper transition between thick and thin strokes and a more modular, geometric design. Reed speculates that "within a few years of the establishment of his foundry, the public taste...experienced a complete revolution...the circumstance may possibly account for the somewhat remarkable absence of any specimen bearing his name for a lengthened period [up to 1815]." Matthew Carter designed a digital font based on his type for Bensley under the name of "Vincent Text" for Newsweek, introduced in 1999.

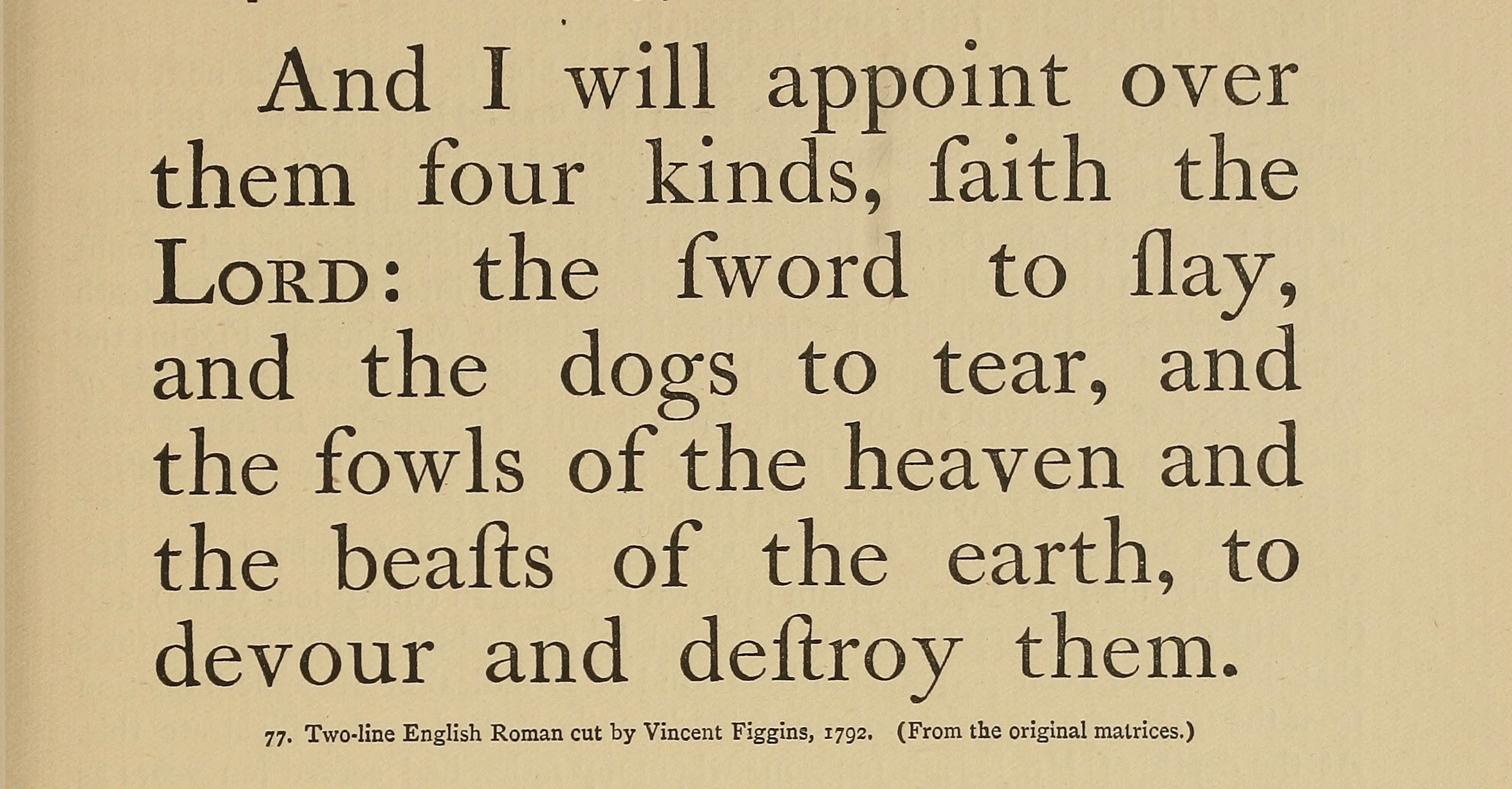
Figgins' 1792 type in the transitional style

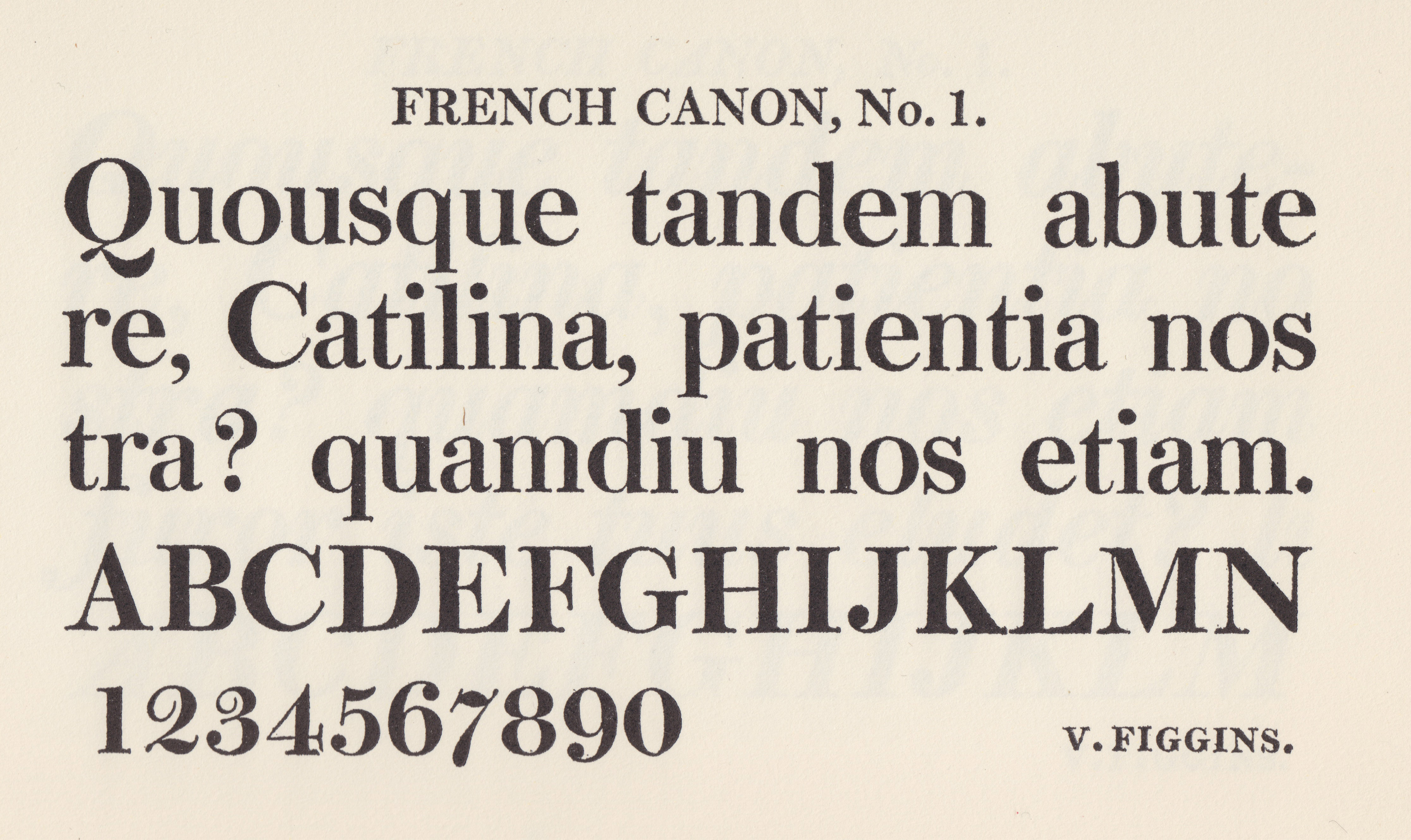
French canon-size face in the modern style

The second part of Figgins' career, from around 1805, coincided with the rise of the mass-market printed poster and an increasing need for dramatic display typefaces. A new technology at that time, the "Sanspareil" matrix in which moulds are made by riveting a cut-out letterform to a backing plate, made casting these types easier than the earlier casting in sand and made the letters print more crisply. (Note: Although this is not to say that the foundry's income was mostly in display type: in 1909, even after over a decade of Linotype and then also Monotype machines cutting into the body type market, a feature on the company reported that it "still finds a very considerable proportion of its business is for body letter...some 75 per cent of the product of at least three well-known typefoundries [is] body letter.")

Although Hansard perhaps over-optimistically felt in 1825 that Figgins had "strayed less into the folly of fat-faced, preposterous disproportions, than either Thorne, Fry or Caslon," the other leading London typefounders of the time, Figgins came to sell many innovative, aggressive designs. What Figgins thought of his foundry's designs and the motivations behind them is not known; as is normal for typeface specimens of the period, his specimens make no comment on the types shown. Librarian and historian James Mosley, the leading contemporary expert on Figgins' career, suggests that the "unusually large range of lighter types" in his specimens suggest some reservations on his part towards the ultra-bold styles of the period, as does the line in his 1823 specimen book that asks the question "The increased fatness in JOB-LETTER is an improvement, but is it not in many cases carried to an extreme?" In 2014, graphic designer Leila Singleton commented "sure, Vincent Figgins was an important figure in the history of type, but let's face it -- his letterforms were imbalanced and hideous."

Figgins was one of the first typefounders to sell "fat face" ultra-bold typefaces. These were serif faces based on the model of Didone letterforms, but with much bolder verticals. Matthew Carter's Elephant (also known as "Big Figgins"), bundled with some Microsoft software, is inspired by the Figgins' fat faces. He also offered a backslanted design, the first known.

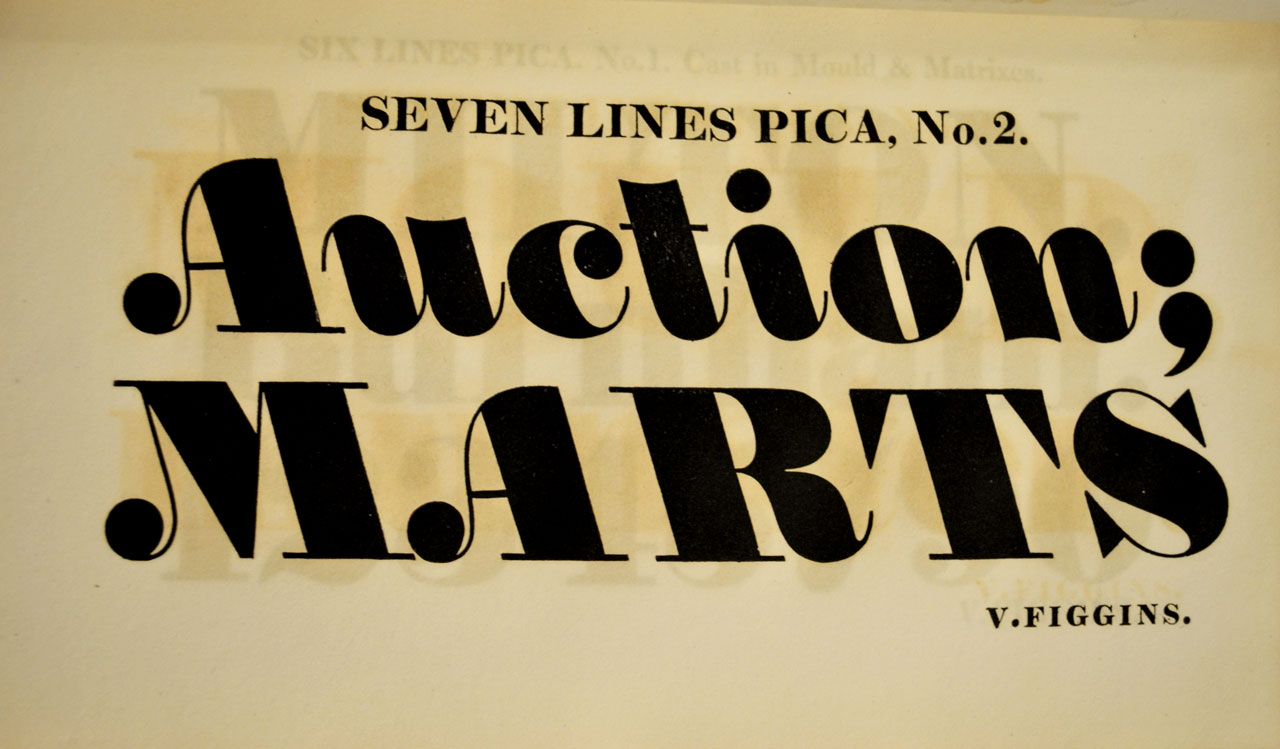
Backslanted "fat face" italic

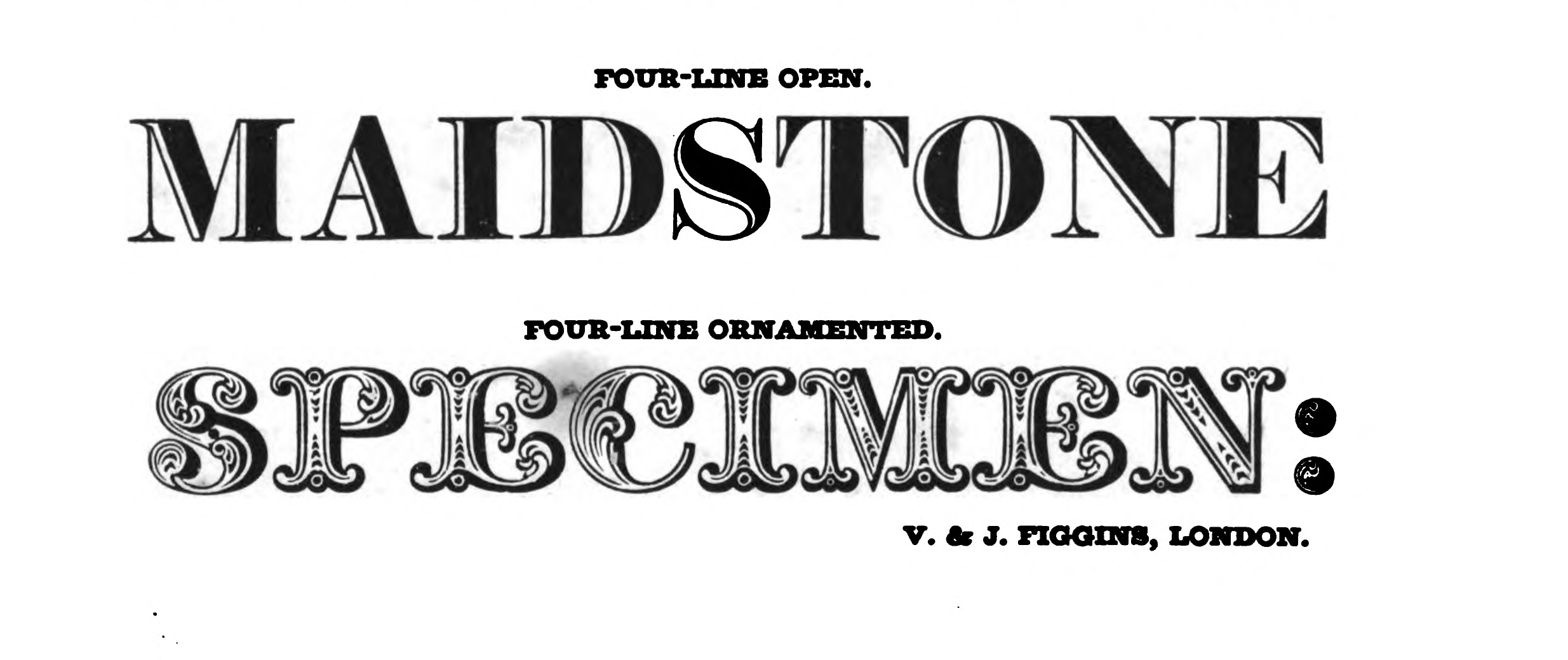
Inline fat face and Ornamented Tuscan. Both in 1815 specimen; image is from 1845 specimen of his sons.

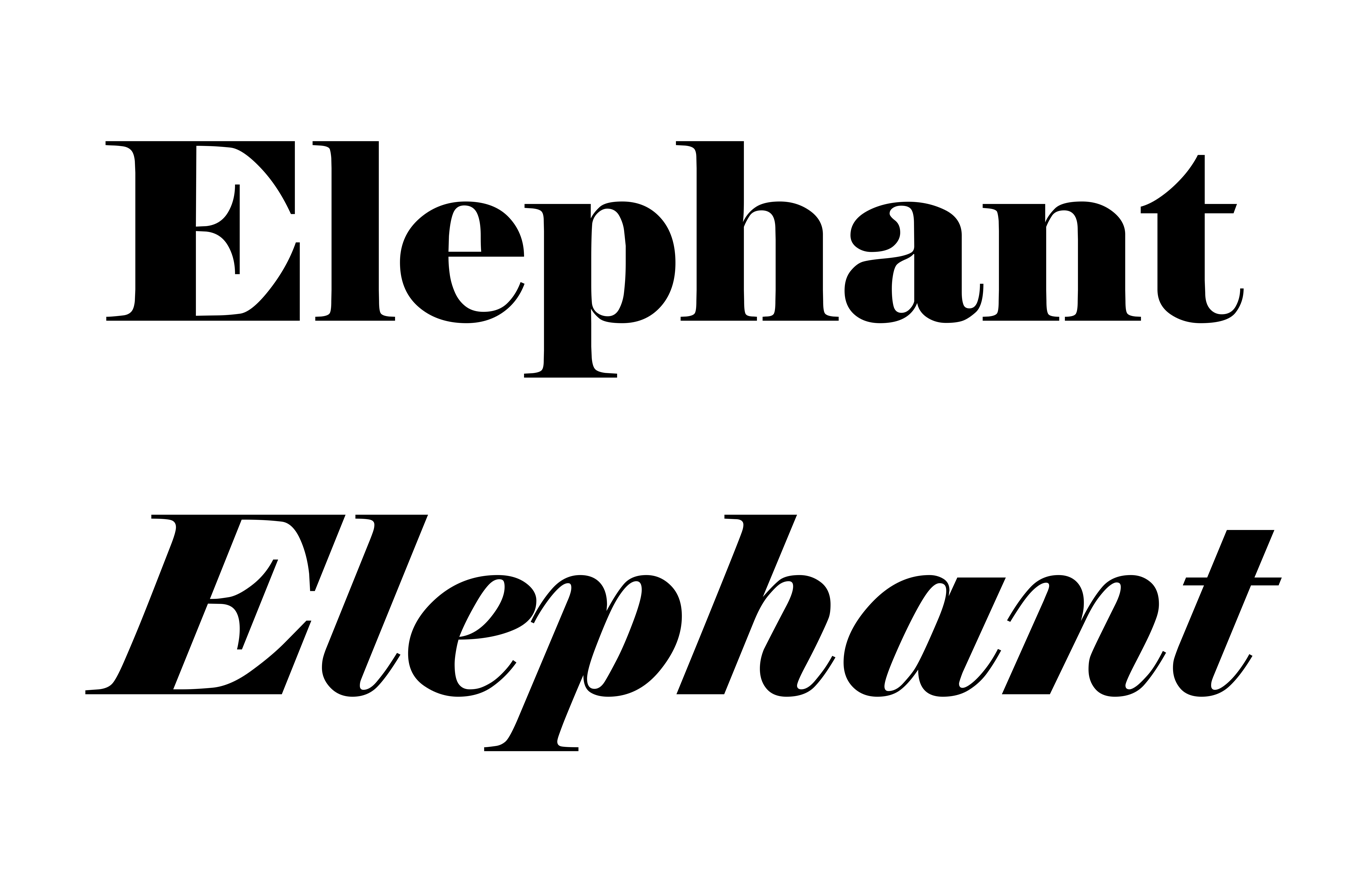
"Elephant", Matthew Carter's digital revival of Figgins' "fat faces"

Figgins is the first known typefounder to have released a slab-serif typeface, a style of typeface with thick block "slab" serifs at the ends of the strokes. His first caps-only type first appeared, under the name of Antique, in a specimen dated 1815 but containing paper with 1817 watermarks. It was probably based on earlier lettering models: Justin Howes found very similar lettering printed from a woodblock on an 1810 lottery advertisement. (Note: Whether Figgins' foundry produced the very first slab-serif is a question that is unlikely to be ever confirmed, but in Nicolete Gray's view "it seems probable" as his was the first in a surviving known specimen book. There is unlikely to ever be certainty as the number of specimen books surviving from the period is very small: the first Figgins specimen to show them was an "1815" specimen containing 1817 watermarked paper, held by Oxford University Press; other 1815-dated Figgins specimens do not show it; another "1815" specimen that was held by Stephenson Blake with 1820 on the spine shows more. No specimens are known from Figgins' main rivals who later produced many slab serifs, the Caslon and Thorne (later Thorowgood) foundries, over the relevant period. Figgins had four sizes in c. 1817, nine c. 1820, and nineteen in a specimen dated 1821 but containing 1823 pages; no Caslon specimens are known between 1816 and 1821, when the first surviving specimen from Caslon to show slab-serifs shows eleven sizes. Thorne had four sizes in 1820. Even fewer specimens survive from other foundries; none are known from Bower and Bacon between 1813 and 1826, by which time they had eighteen sizes. Gray concluded that any of Figgins, Thorowgood and Caslon could have been first to issue a lower-case (already seen on the 1810 woodblock), as they all introduced ones around 1820.)

Opinions of the design varied from Nicolete Gray's view of the slab-serif as "the most brilliant typographical innovation of the nineteenth century", to Hansard showing it among other "typographic monstrosities!!!". In recent times, Hoefler & Frere-Jones described his slab serif as lumpy: "[it] gives the impression that its designer simply began with one letter and worked his way through the alphabet until the project was complete, never stopping to articulate the design's policies or anticipate any problems. In many ways, this design is two typefaces, its uppercase and lowercase being almost wholly unrelated." Both Mosley and Hoefler and Frere-Jones highlighted the perfectly circular, unstressed "O" as a part of the design which was abandoned in later slab-serifs, although Mosley describes it as "more logical" than vertical-stress designs that replaced it and felt that the type "suffers from being a pioneer design". Slab serifs proliferated during the nineteenth century, using alternative names including "Egyptian", "Ionics" and "Clarendons". (Note: A hint of the limits of Figgins' influence is his choice of typeface names. Where Figgins chose the names "antique" (slab-serif) and "sans-serif", William Thorowgood's Fann Street Foundry used "Egyptian" and "Grotesque"; both these names became very common abroad. Egyptian had previously been used for a sans-serif typeface. In all cases the names may have referred to the primitive feel of the simplified monoline letters, the blocky nature of Egyptian architecture, or the sans-serif's roots in ancient inscriptions.)

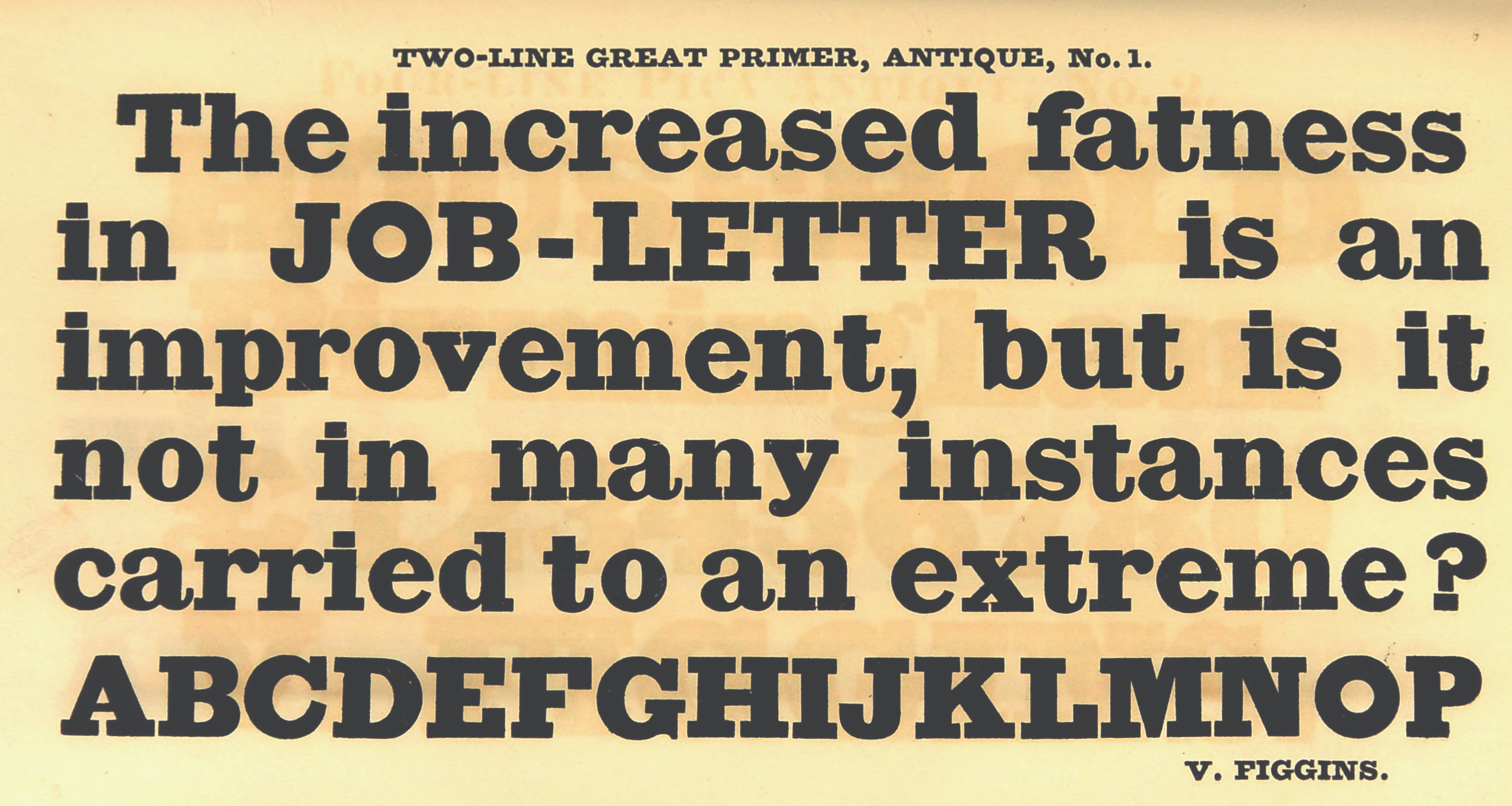
Figgins' "Antique" (slab-serif) typeface expresses doubt about bold typefaces; 1834 specimen, note circular 'O' not adopted by most other typefounders

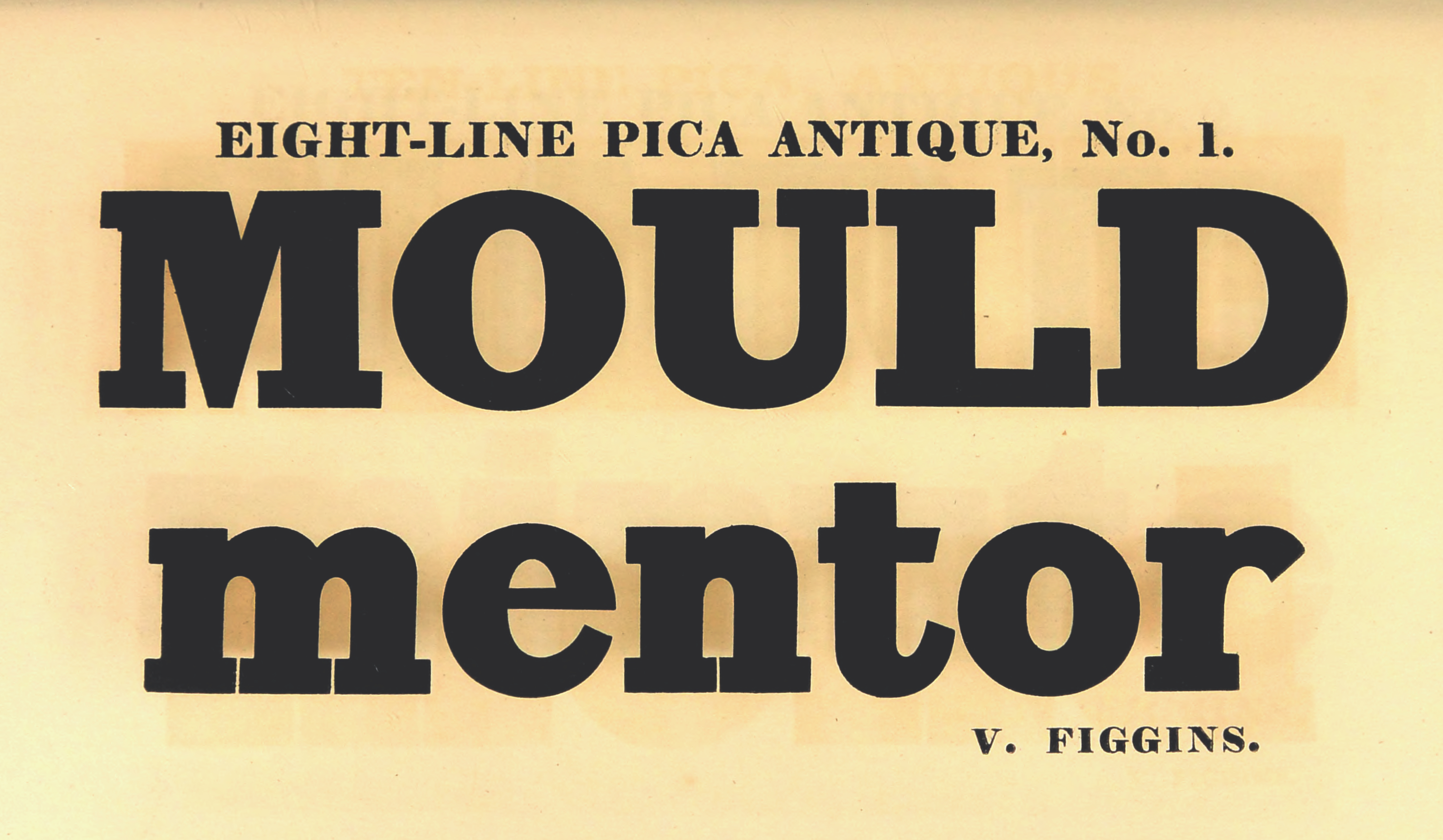
Slab-serif in second style, 1834 specimen, 'O' has normal stress.

In 1828 Figgins became the second typefounder to sell a face of sans-serif capitals, and quickly introduced a large range of sizes. Sans-serifs had become popular in sign lettering in the preceding decades; William Caslon IV had issued one sans-serif typeface around 1816 without apparent success (no uses are known). In Walter Tracy's view "he made the style a reality", and for Mosley this "brought the design into typography". Figgins also introduced the term "sans-serif", not previously attested. The style had before been called "Egyptian" or "old Roman" characters.

Figgins first showed a sans-serif, a quite bold design of normal width, in 1828, before quickly releasing a large range of sizes from 1832 onwards. David Ryan felt that the design was "cruder but much larger" than William Caslon IV's, making it a success. Many of his later sans-serifs were extremely condensed, apparently on the model of a Thorowgood face first known from about 1830.

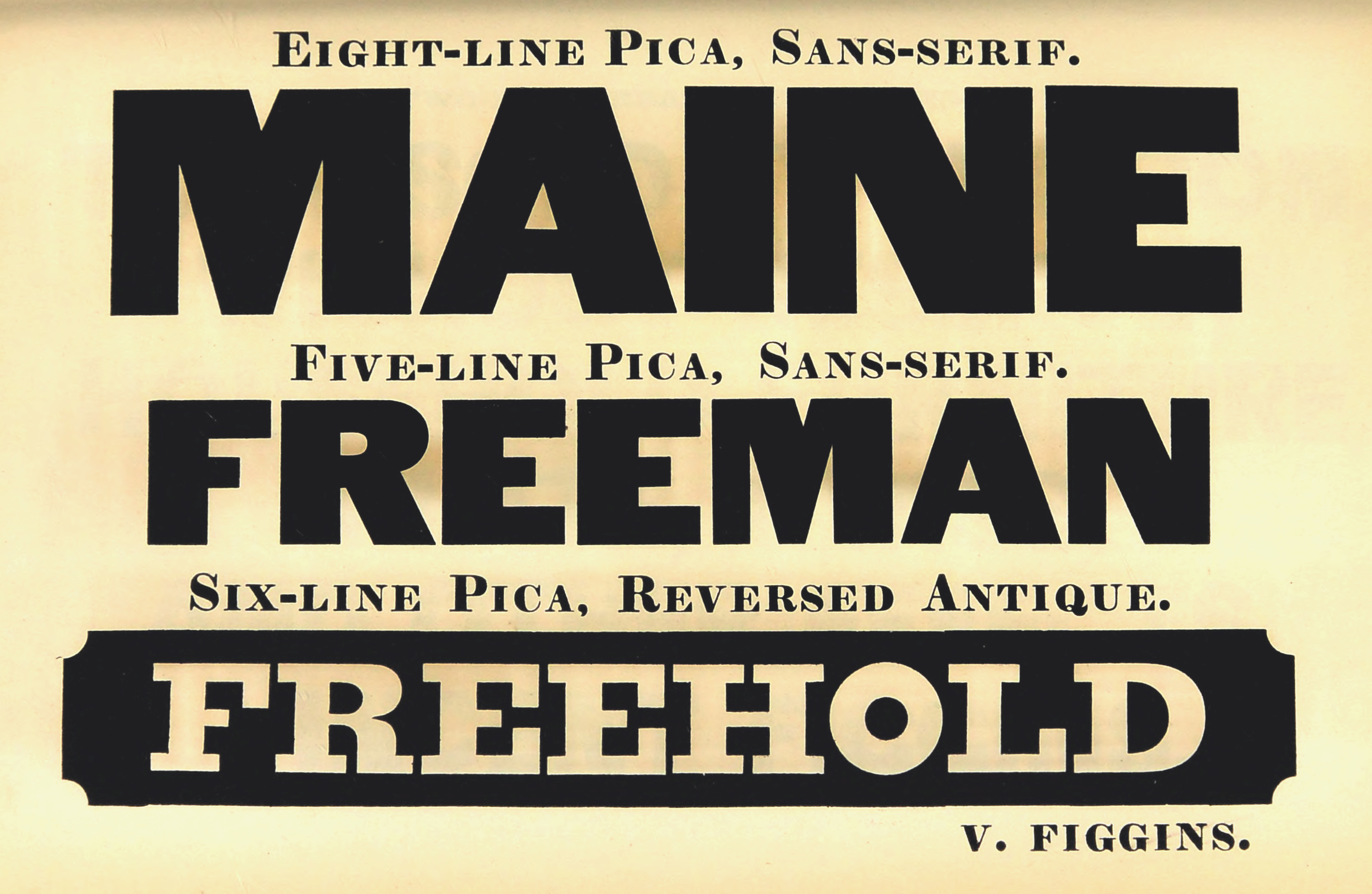
Ultra-bold sans-serifs; 8-line is Figgins' first, known from 1828, 5-line from 1830.

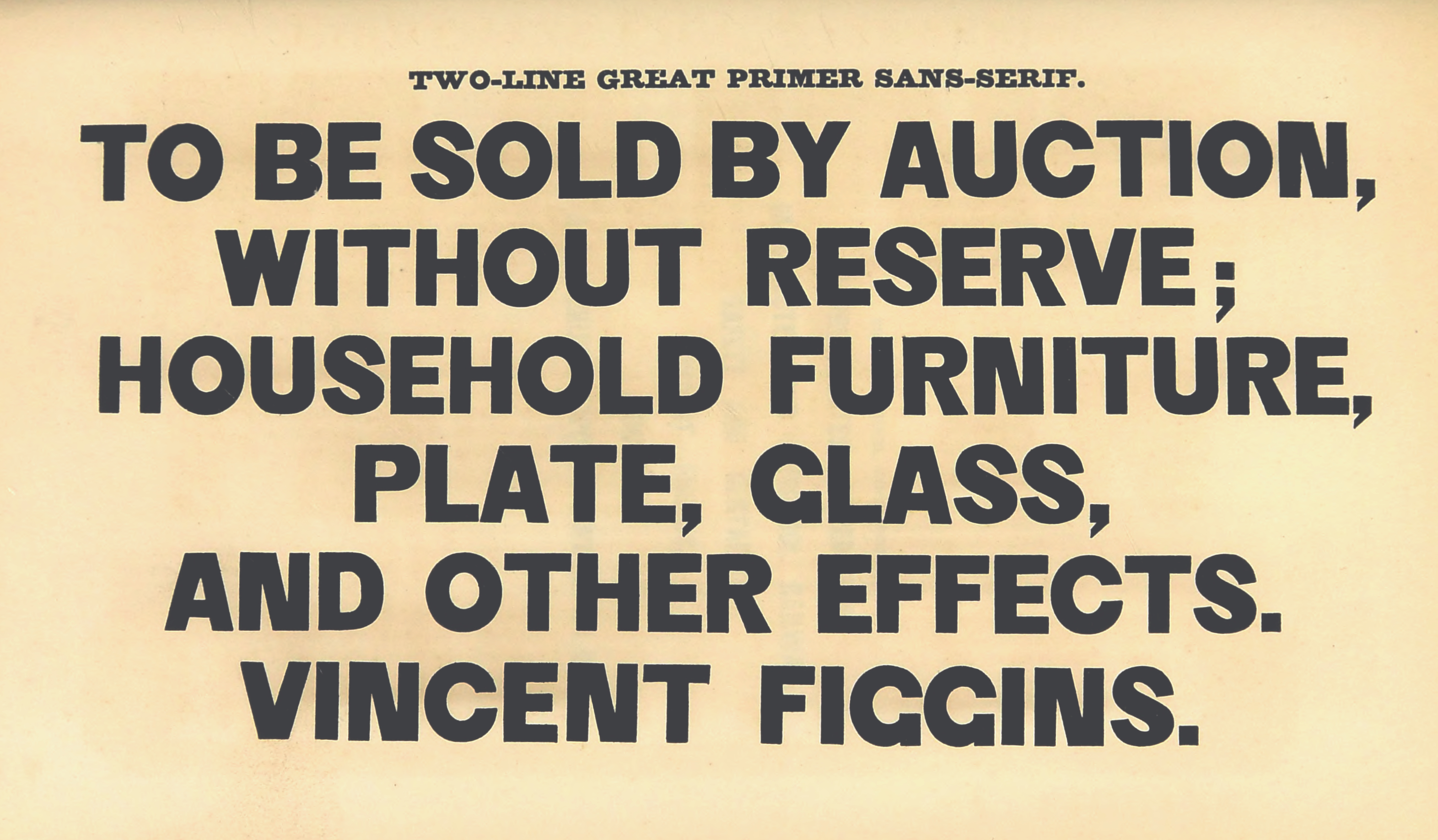
Two-Line Great Pica Sans-Serif, in 1834 specimen

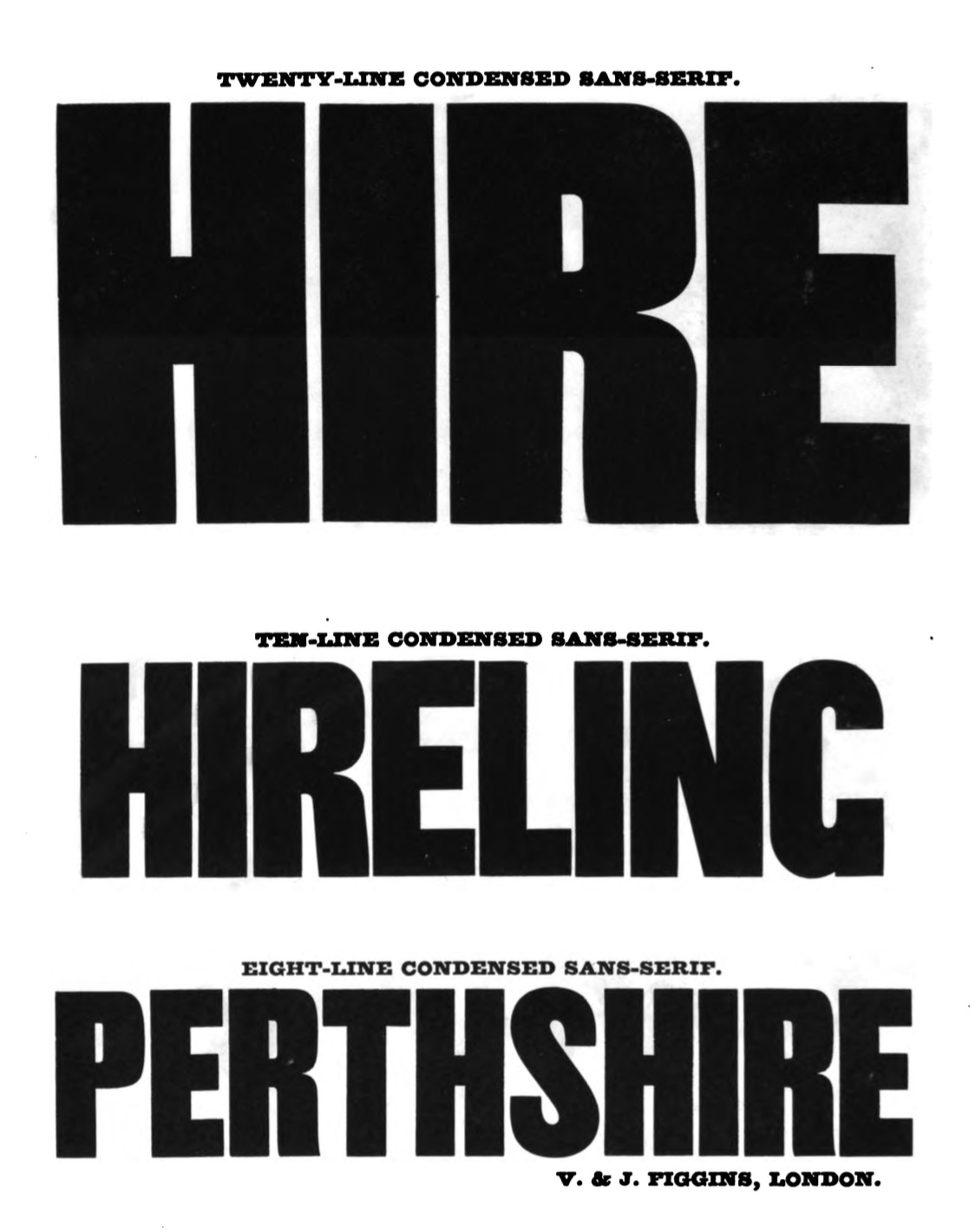
Condensed sans-serifs from the 1845 specimen of his sons

Figgins also sold shadowed faces, and blackletter faces in inline and double-inline versions. One type of typeface Figgins did not so much sell was decorated types with a pattern or artwork inside the letter, of a kind popular in France and particularly sold by Louis John Pouchée in London. He did issue a small decorated "Tuscan" (typeface with branching serifs) in the 1810s. (Note: Pouchee's very large types were reproduced using an unusual method known as 'dabbing', in which wood patterns were driven into molten metal almost at the point of solidifying to make a mould. Figgins' small Tuscan was made in the normal method using steel punches driven into matrices; the punches for the Tuscan were in a private collection as of 1993.) Figgins' later ornaments were in a weighty style complementary to his typefaces.

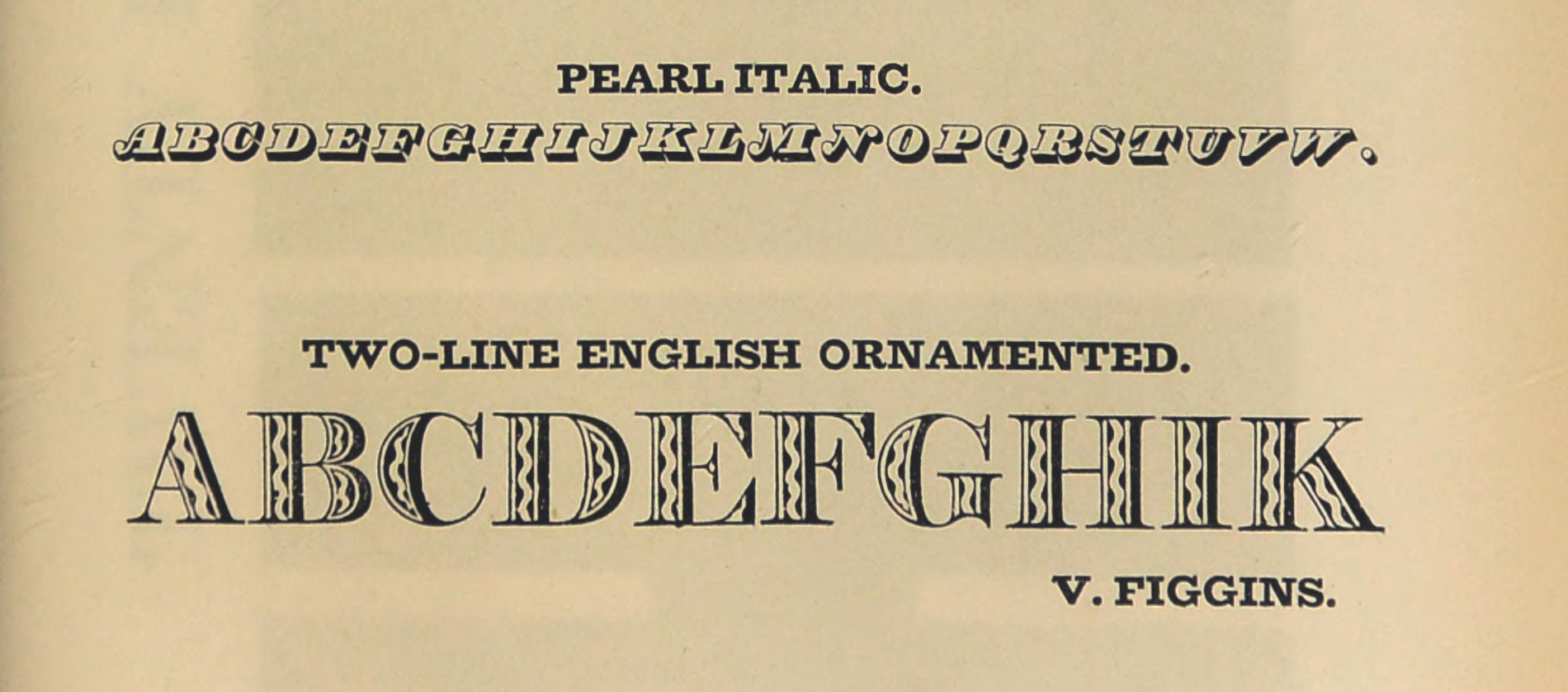
Shadowed italic and ornamented typefaces

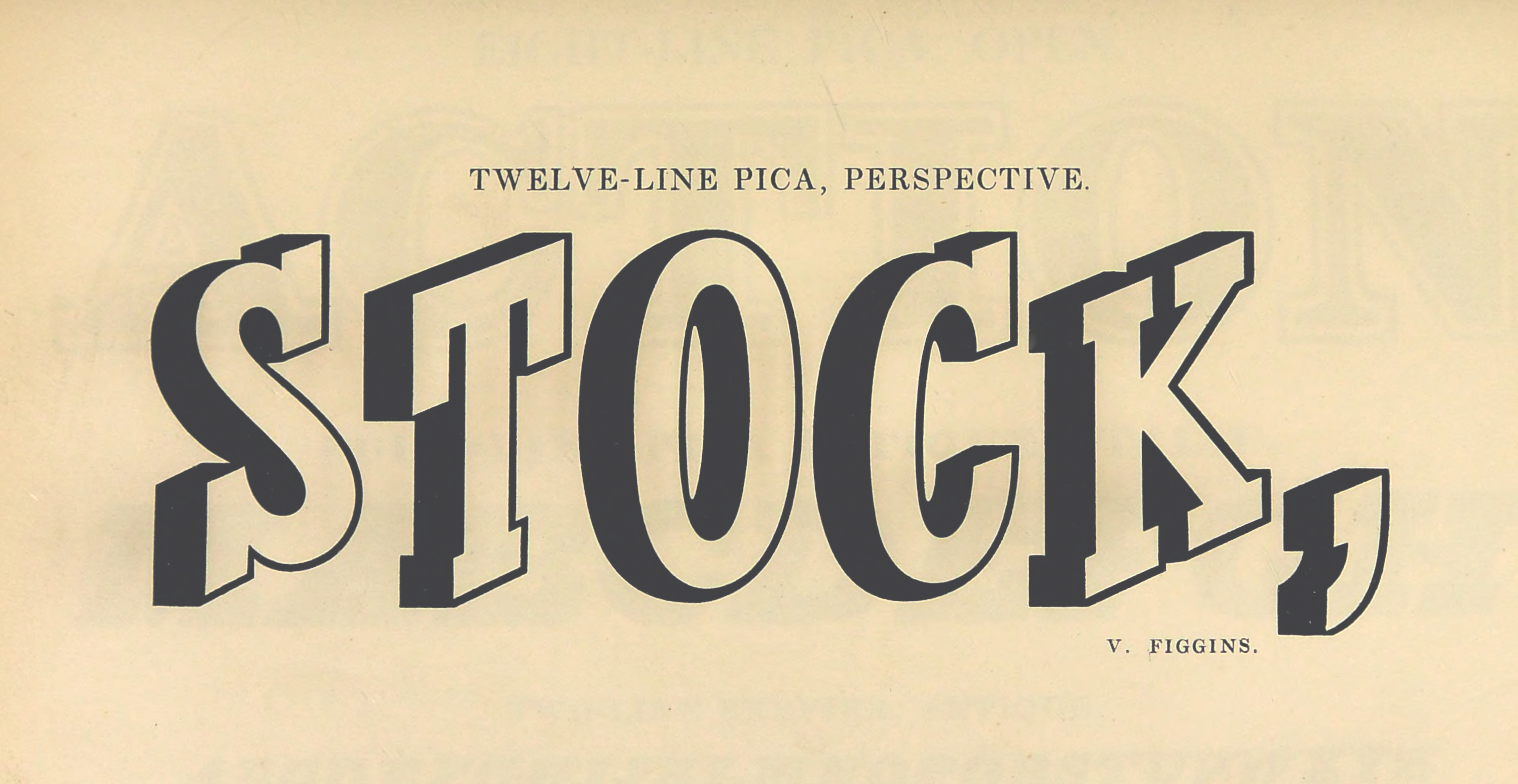
Twelve-Line Pica Perspective, in 1834 specimen

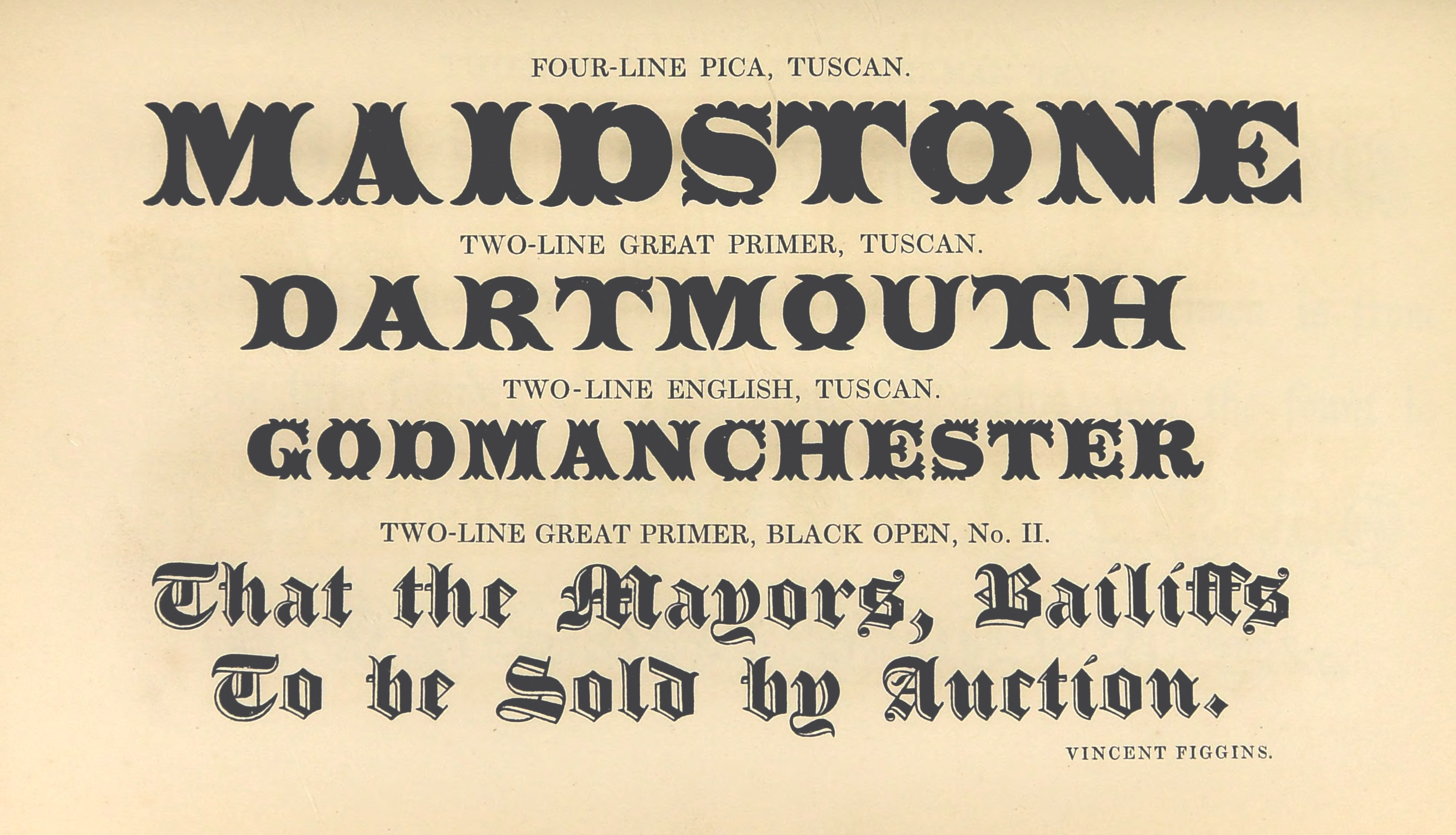
Solid tuscans and inline blackletter, 1834 specimen

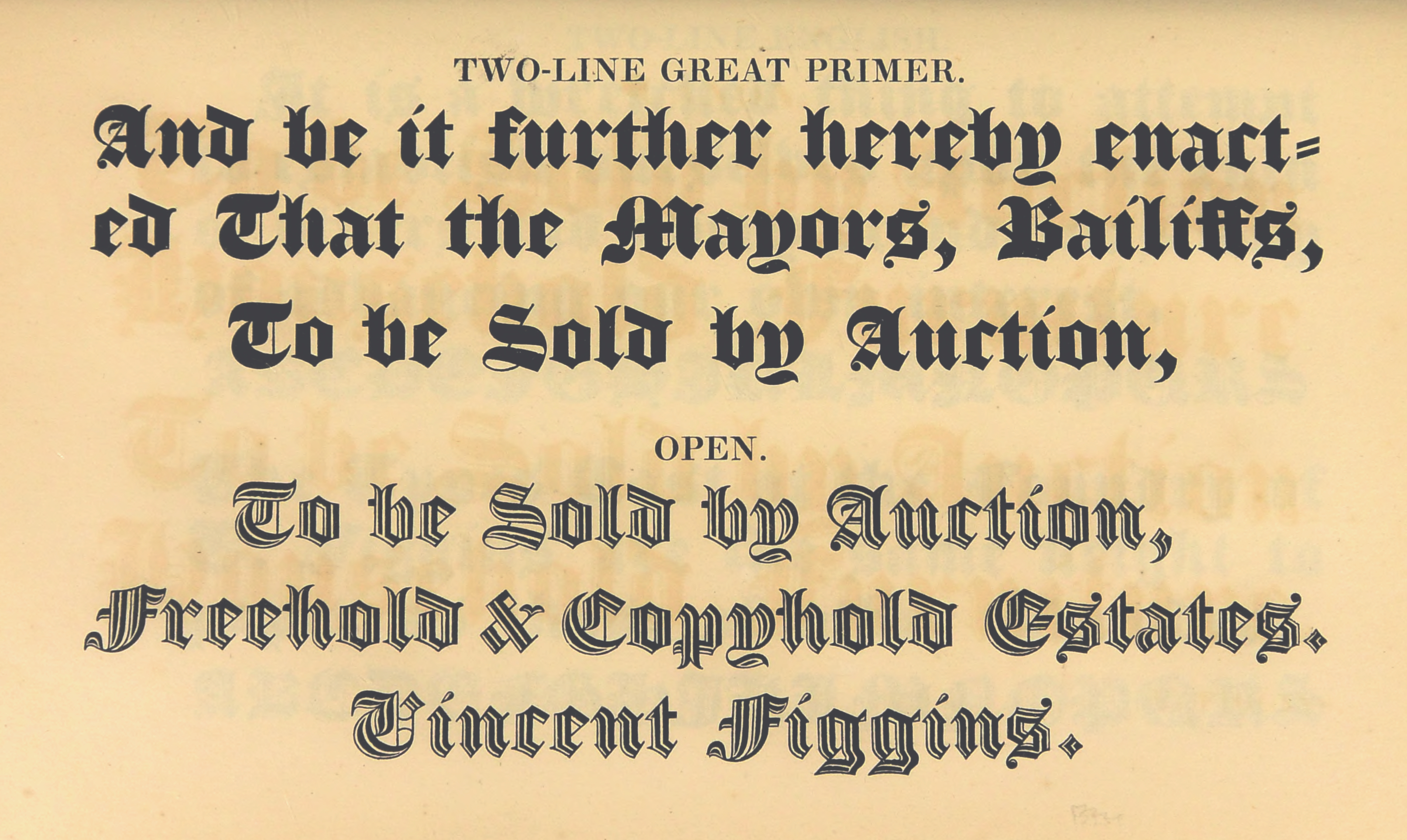
Ultra-bold and double inline blackletter, 1834

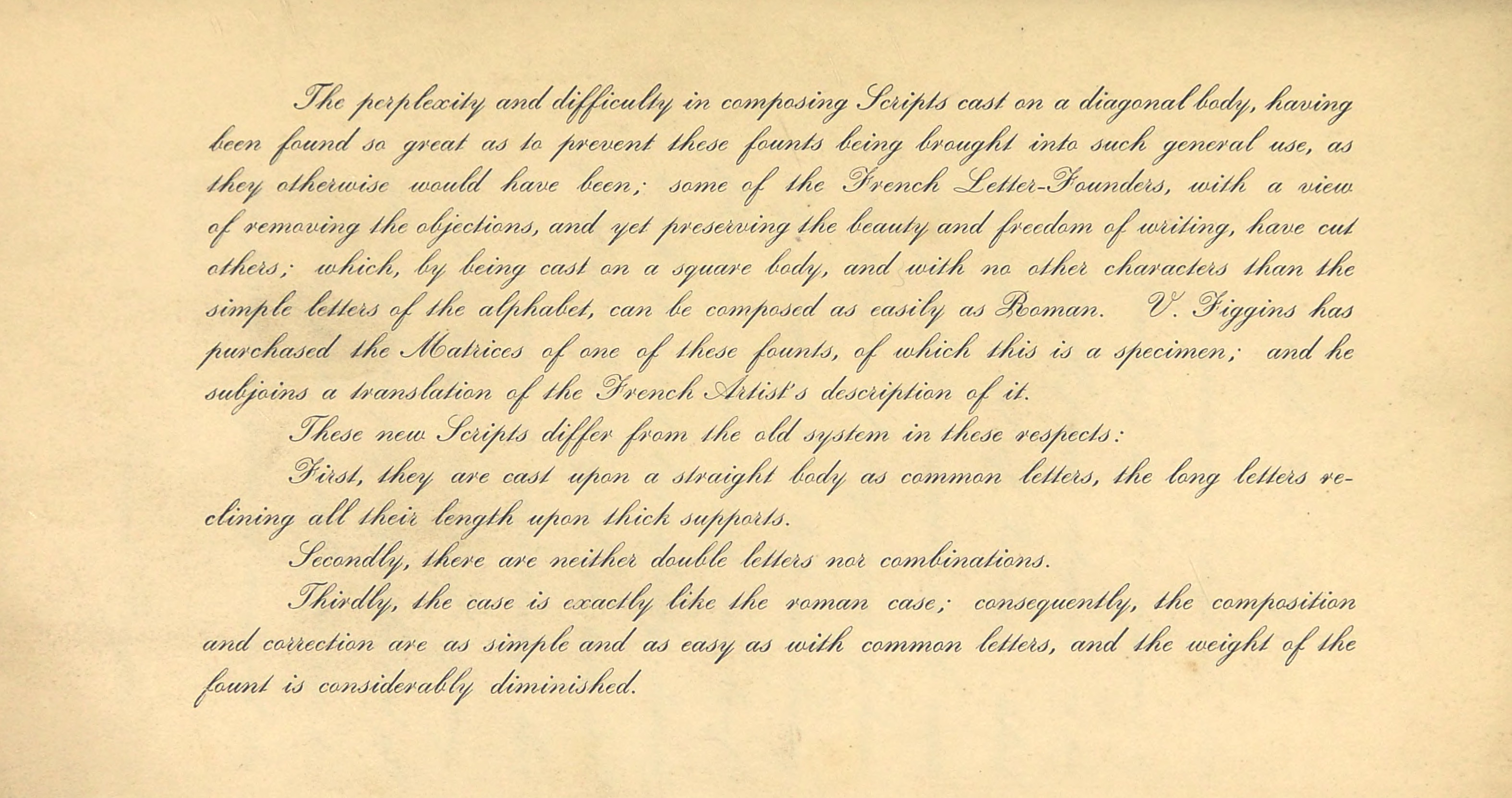
Script typeface, 1834. Not Figgins' own; purchased from France.

Figgins sold many non-roman types, according to Hansard Greek, Hebrew, Irish, Persian, Saxon, Syriac and Telugu by 1825. Hansard commented in 1825 that "no foundry existing is better stocked with these extraneous sorts...astronomical, geometrical, algebraical, physical, genealogical and arithmetical sorts". In 1825 he was hired by the linguist John Gilchrist to produce type for his proposed "Universal Character", a phonetic alphabet intended for transcribing foreign languages. He also offered a Pica-size face of Bengali, according to Fiona Ross "perhaps the first to be cut on a commercial basis". Figgins' later ornaments were in a weighty style complementary to his typefaces.

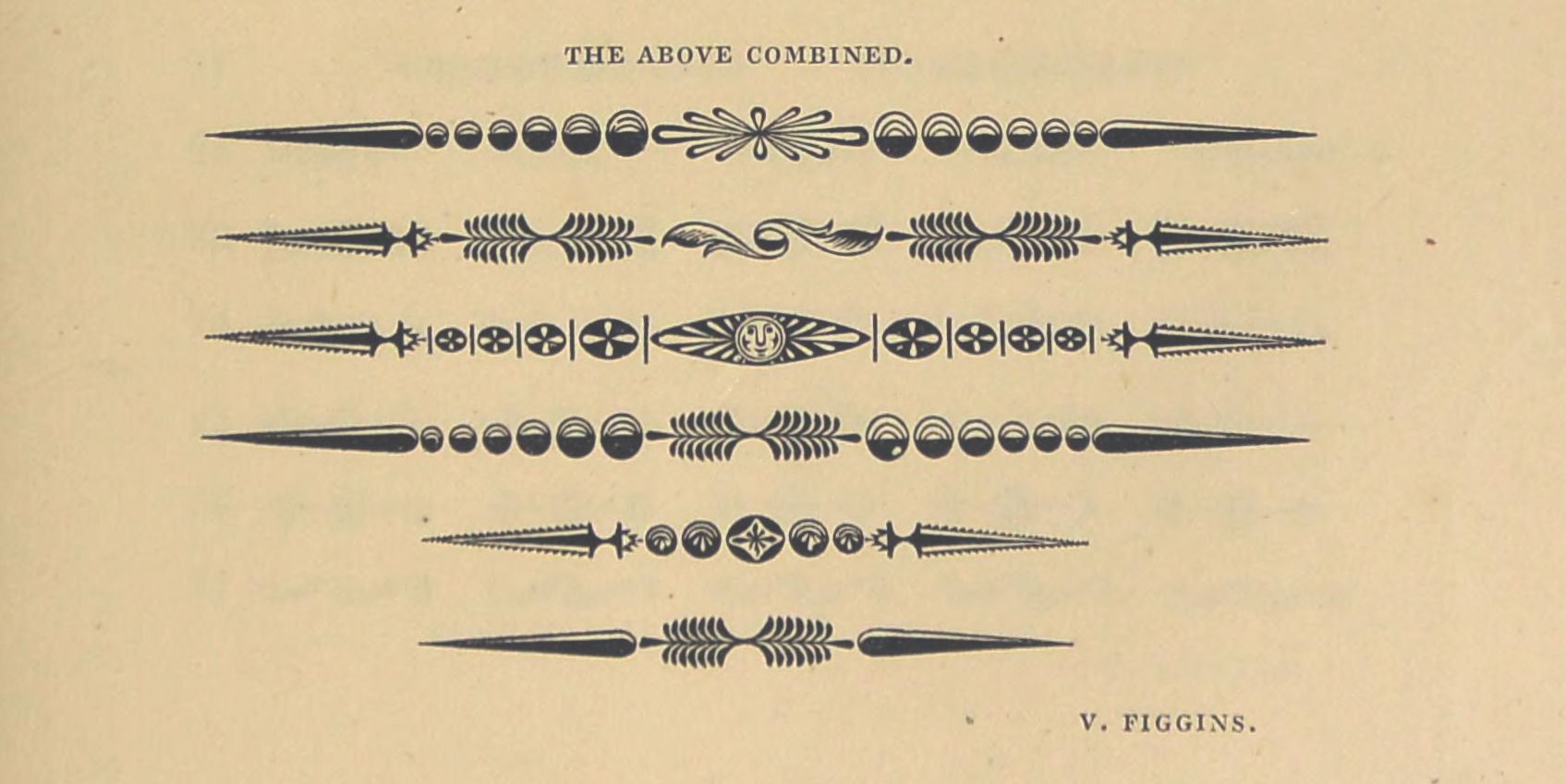
Line dividers

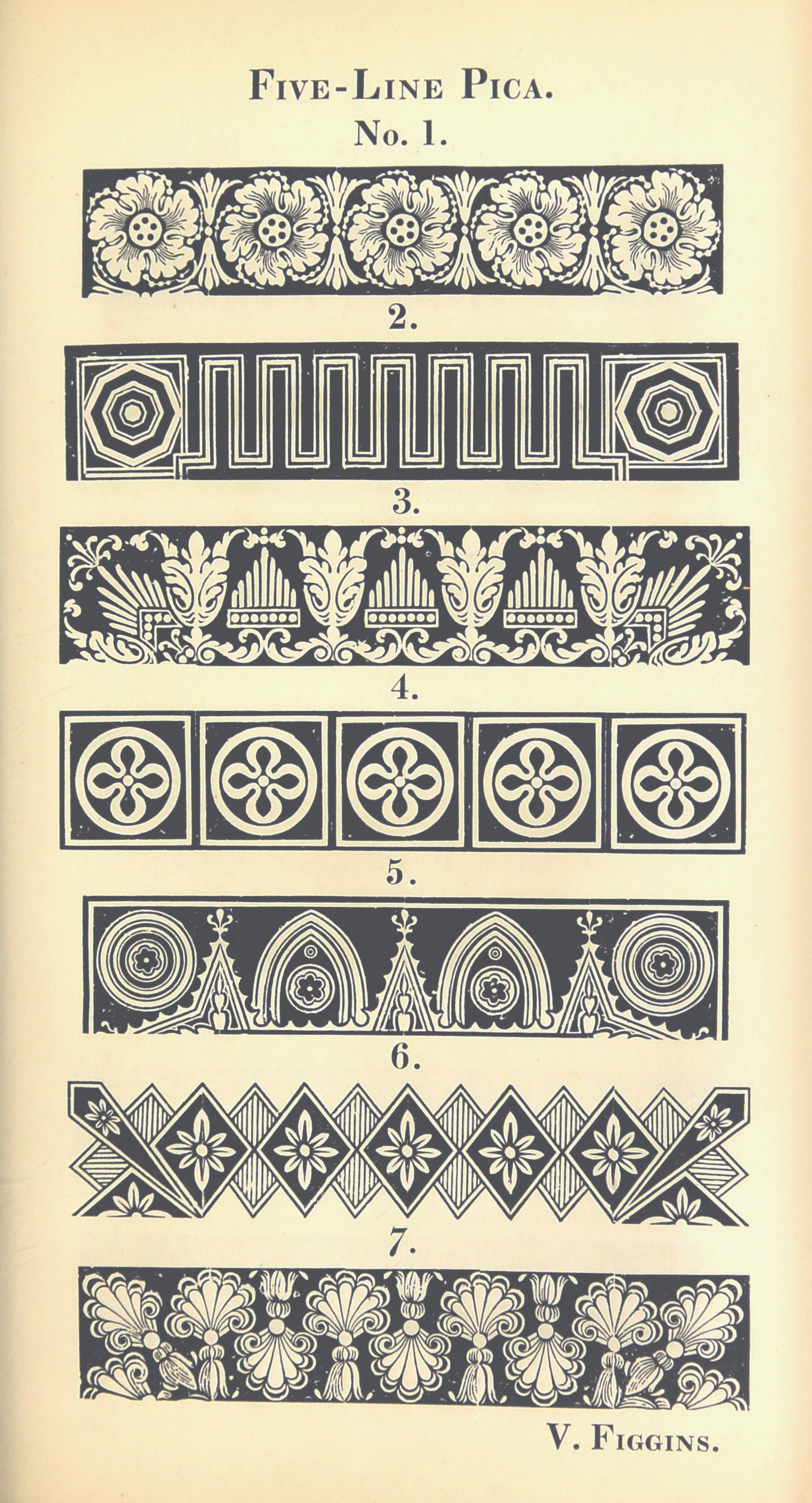
Ornaments

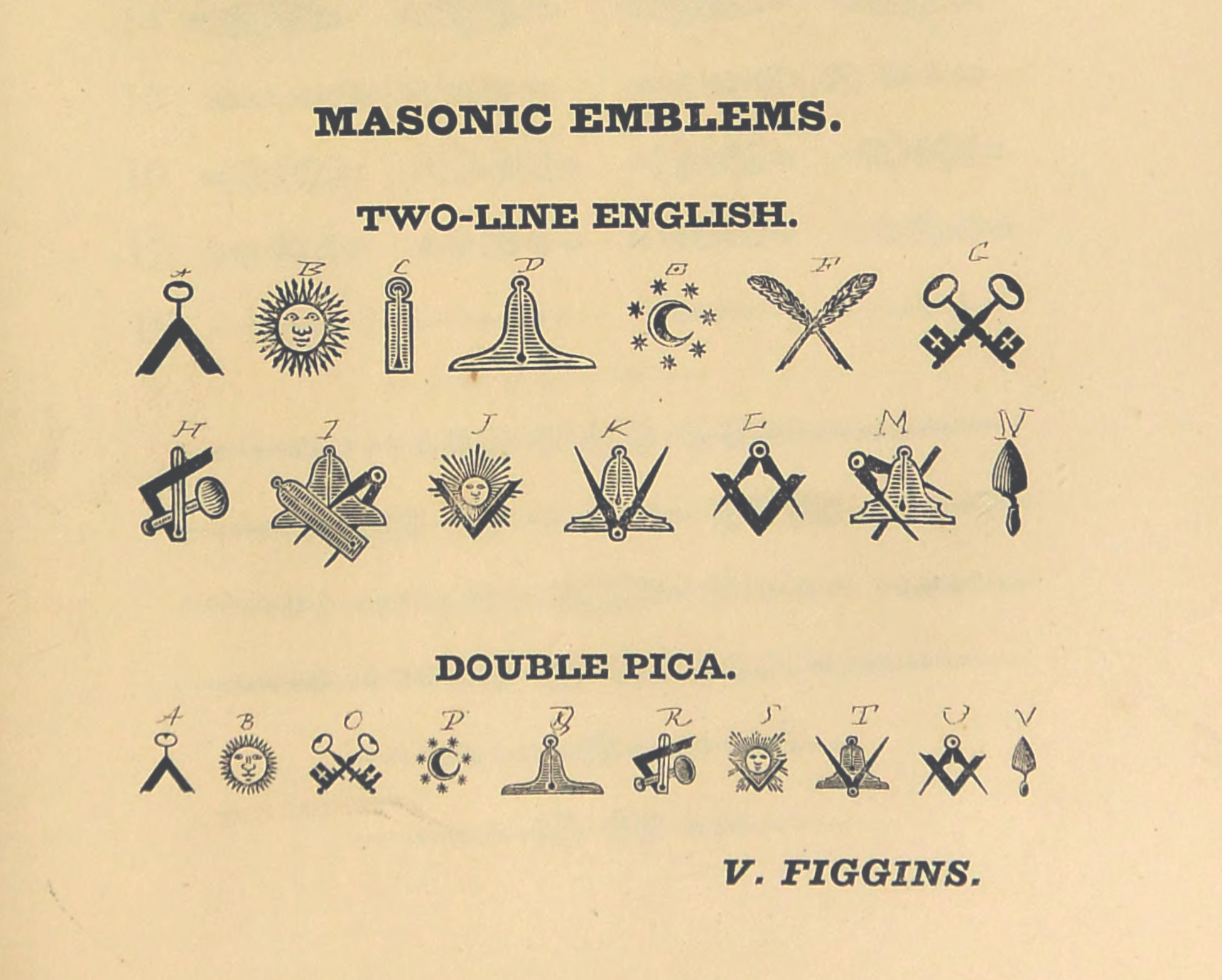
Masonic emblems

Figgins' Greek typefaces are first shown in a specimen of 1815; at this time most were in the "old style" descending from the Grecs du roi; one was more in the Porson style. According to Bowman the next specimen (with an 1821 title page but some leaves dated 1822) has more types in the Porson style although one influenced by a type from the Wilson foundry. Bowman wrote of the Great Primer and Pica no. 3 of this specimen that "I think they are the most beautiful Greek type ever devised" and that his foundry became "the most important in the production of Greek type in England".

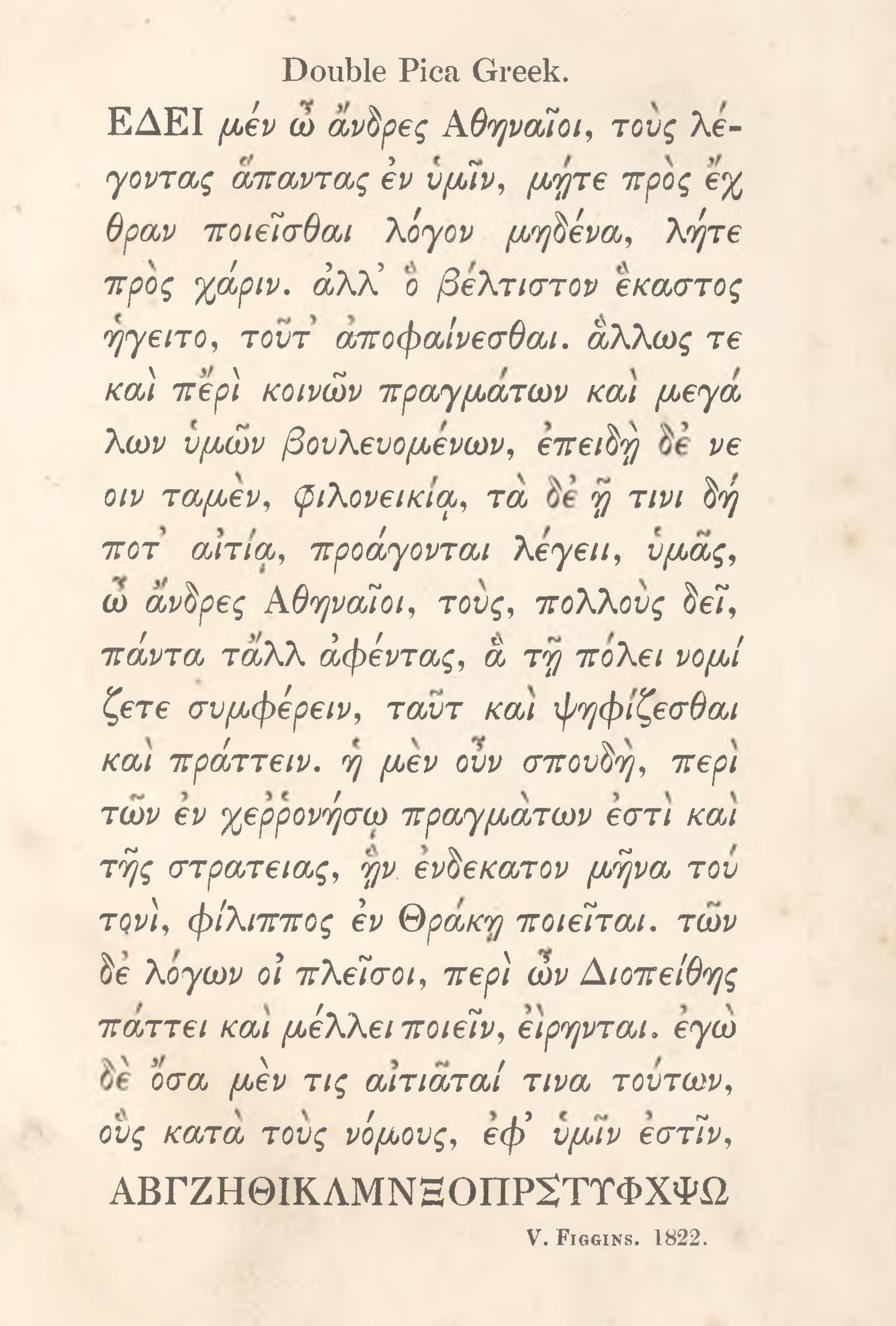
Double Pica Greek typeface, resembling a modernisation of a type from the Wilson foundry, "1821" specimen

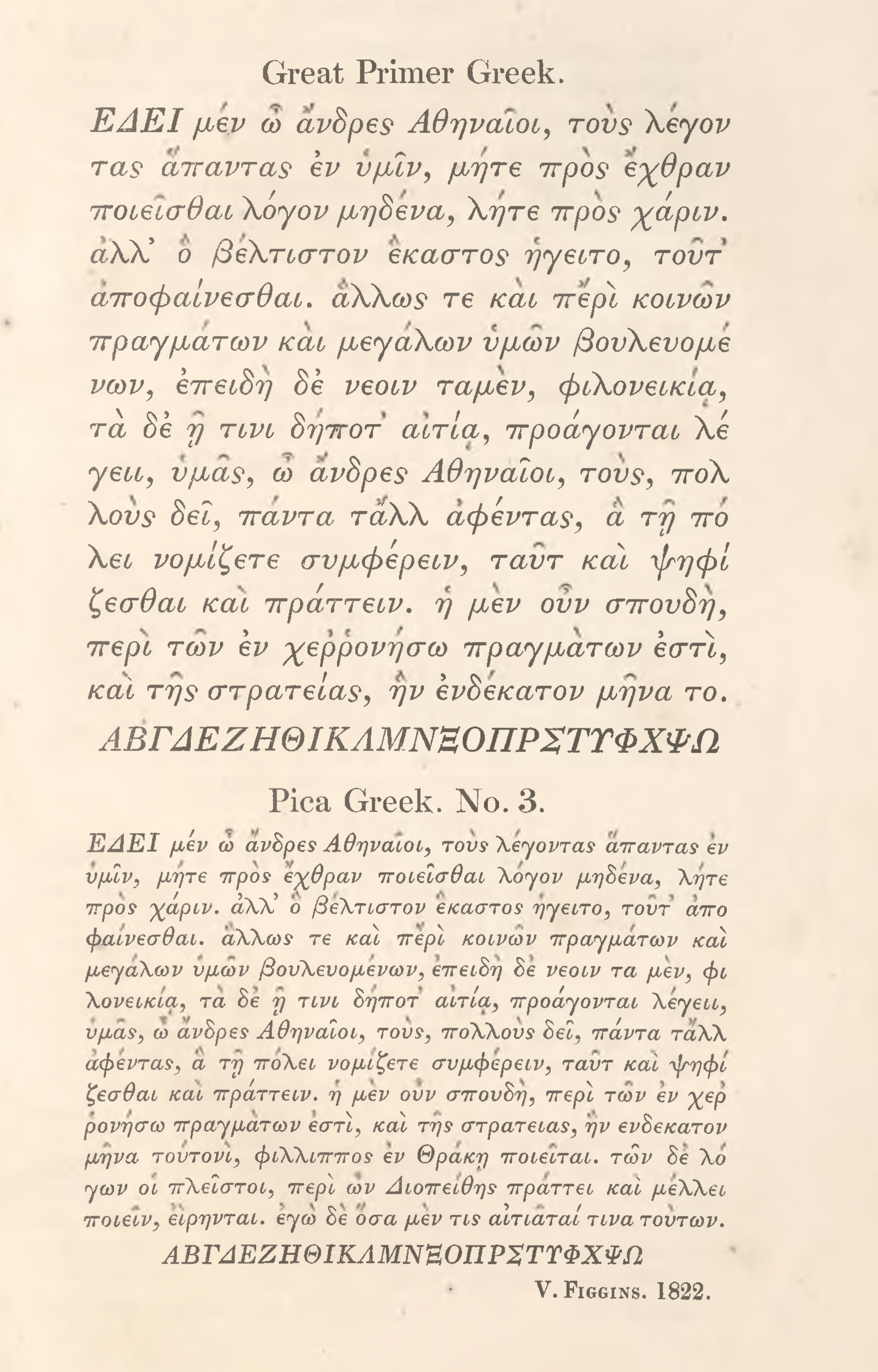
Great Primer and Pica No. 3 Greek typefaces, "1821" specimen, for Bowman "the most beautiful Greek type ever"

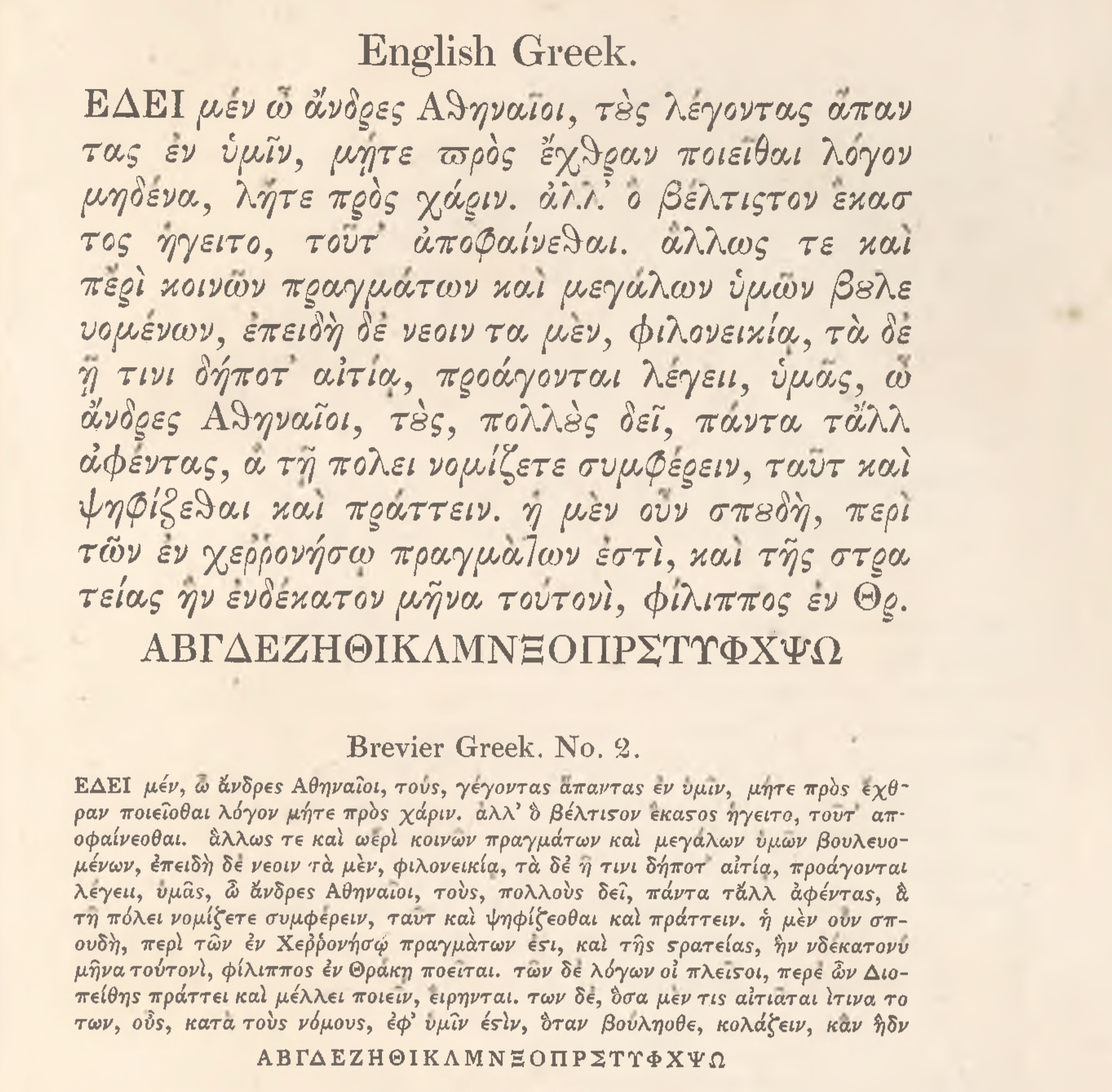
English and Brevier No. 2 Greek typefaces, "1821" specimen

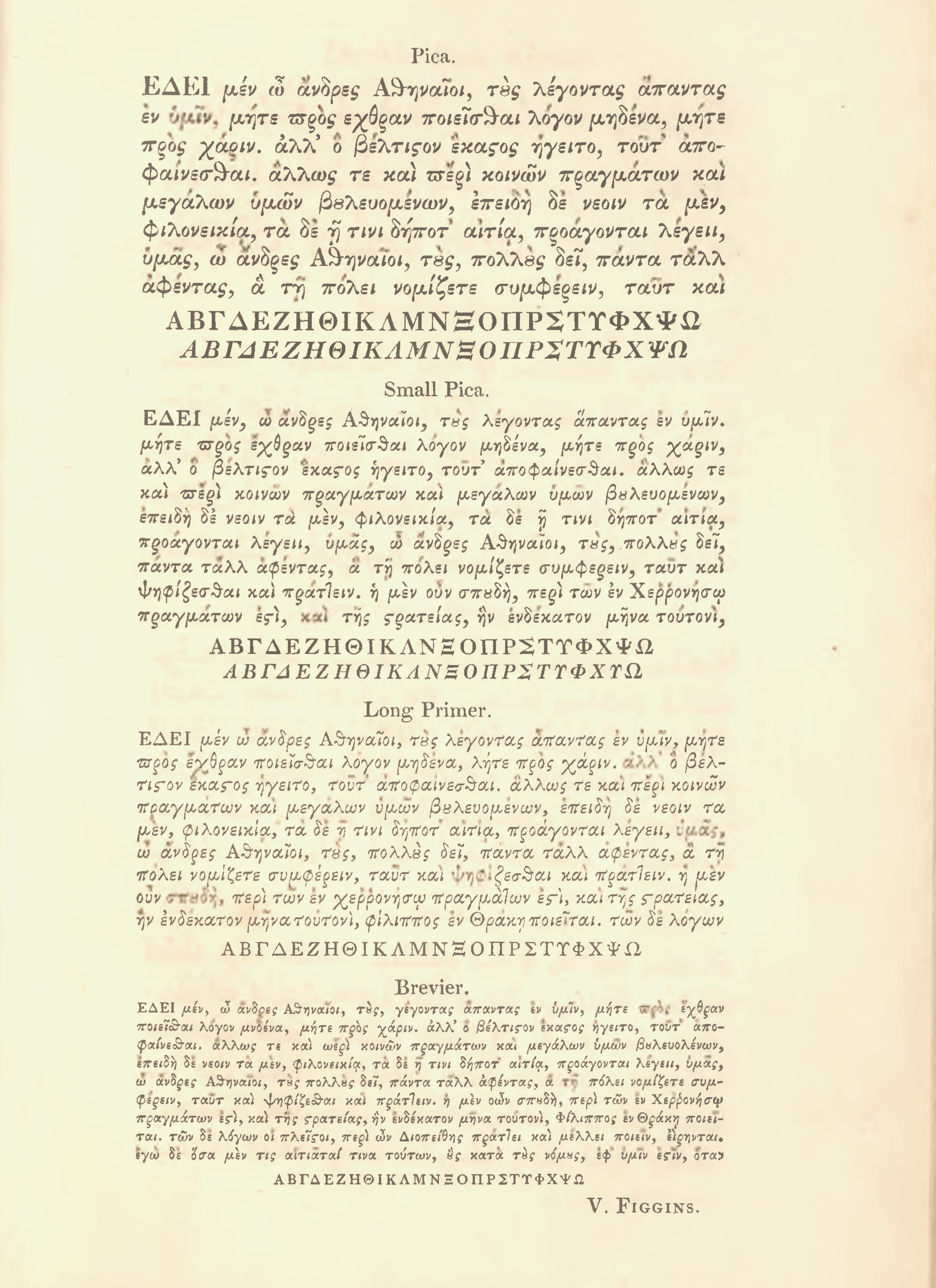
Pica, Small Pica, Long Primer and Brevier Greek typefaces, "1821" specimen

== Retirement and later life ==
Figgins ran his foundry until 1836 when he retired to live at 1 Prospect Place, Peckham Rye. He transferred his foundry to his two eldest sons, Vincent Figgins of Southgate and James Figgins, who issued a first specimen book under their own name in 1838. James Figgins (1811–1884) was elected to Parliament in 1868 as an MP for Shrewsbury.

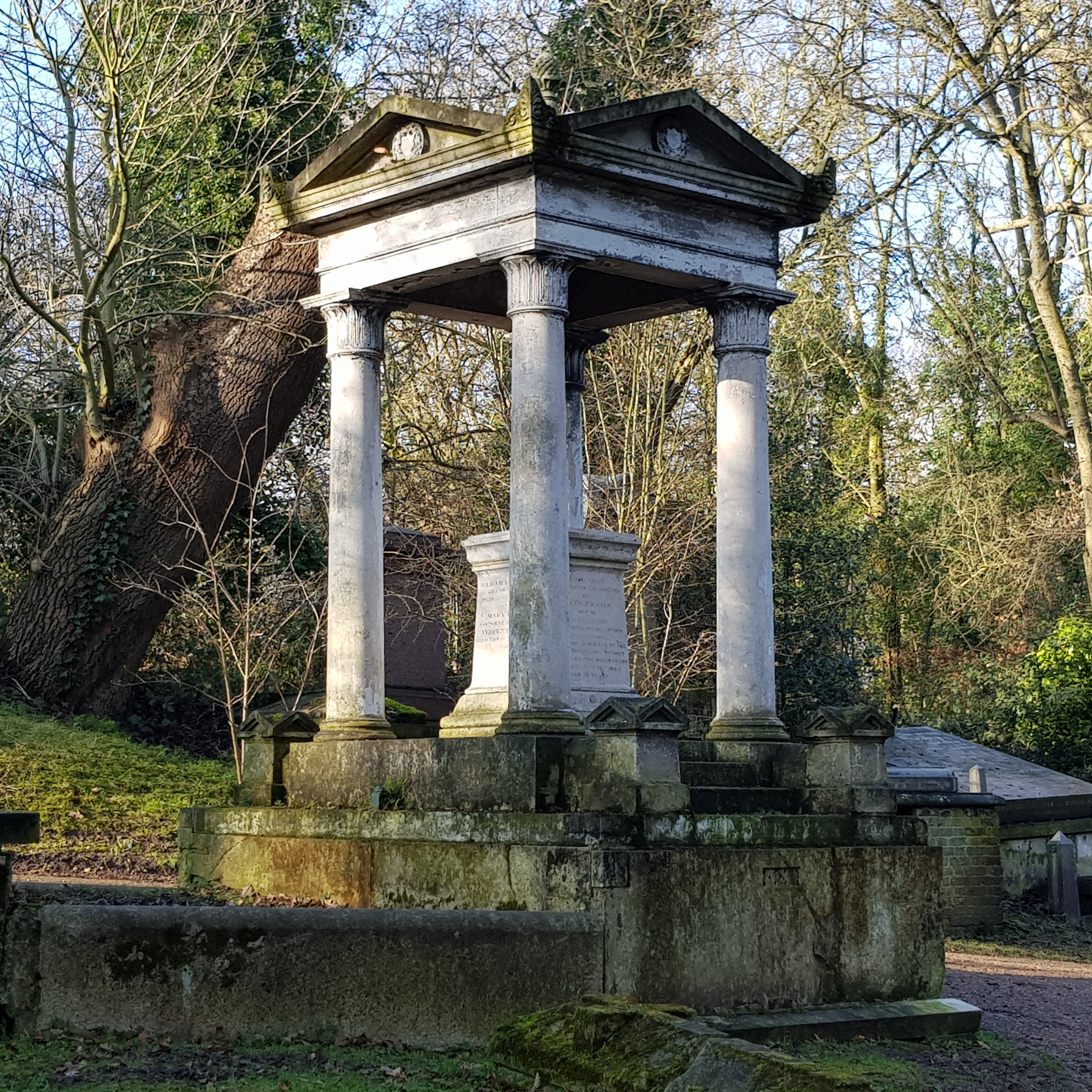
Grave of Vincent Figgins, his wife and other family members

Figgins died on 29 February 1844 at Peckham Rye, and is buried in Nunhead Cemetery in a memorial designed by William Pettit Griffith, shared with his wife Elizabeth, sons Vincent Figgins II and James Figgins, and Vincent Figgins II's wife Rosanna. The memorial is now Grade II listed. The second Vincent Figgins is also commemorated at his local church, Christ Church, Southgate.

== Legacy ==
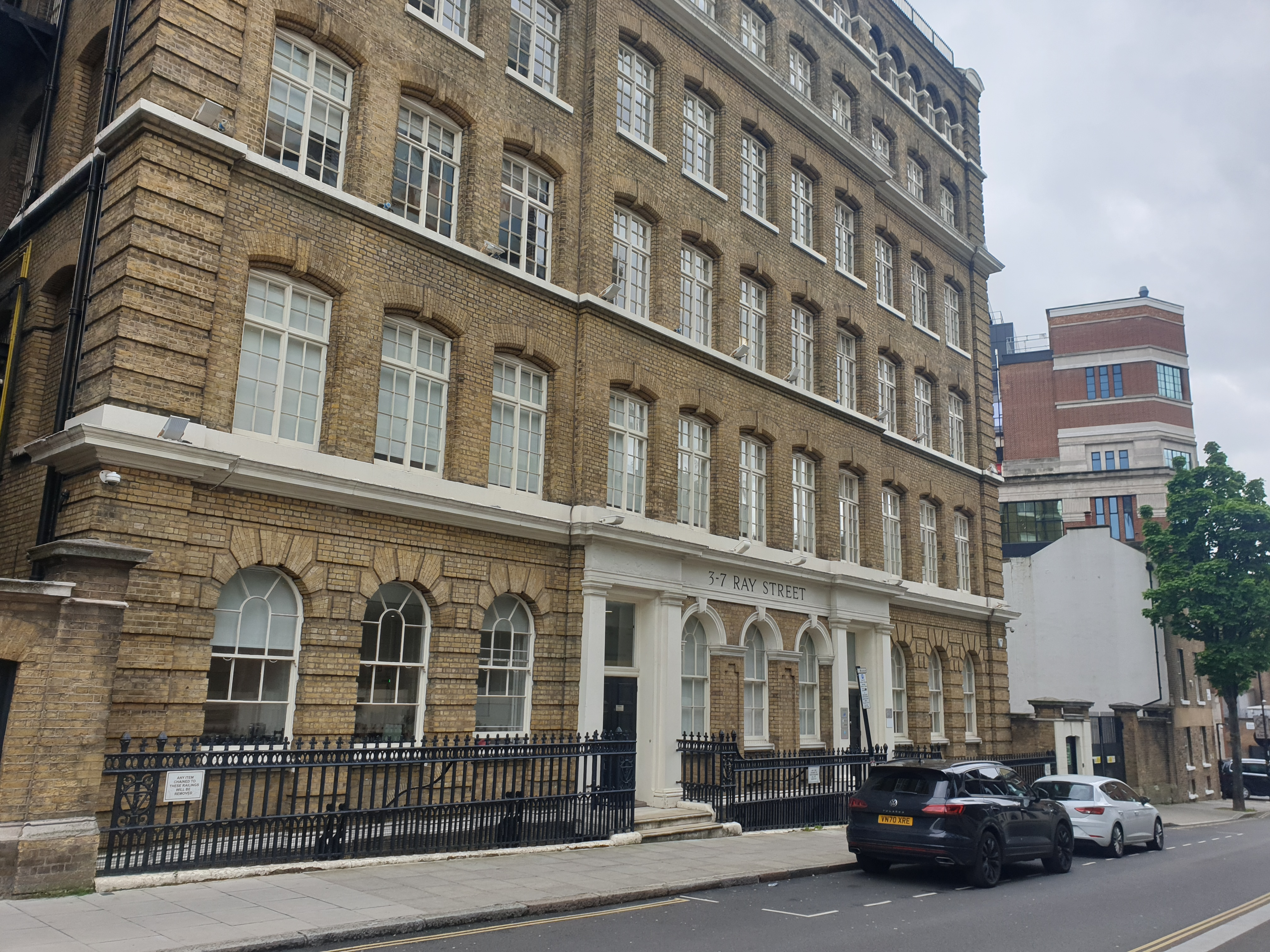
Figgins' company was based at 3–7 Ray Street, Clerkenwell from the 1860s to the 1900s. Below: the VJF monogram of Vincent & James Figgins

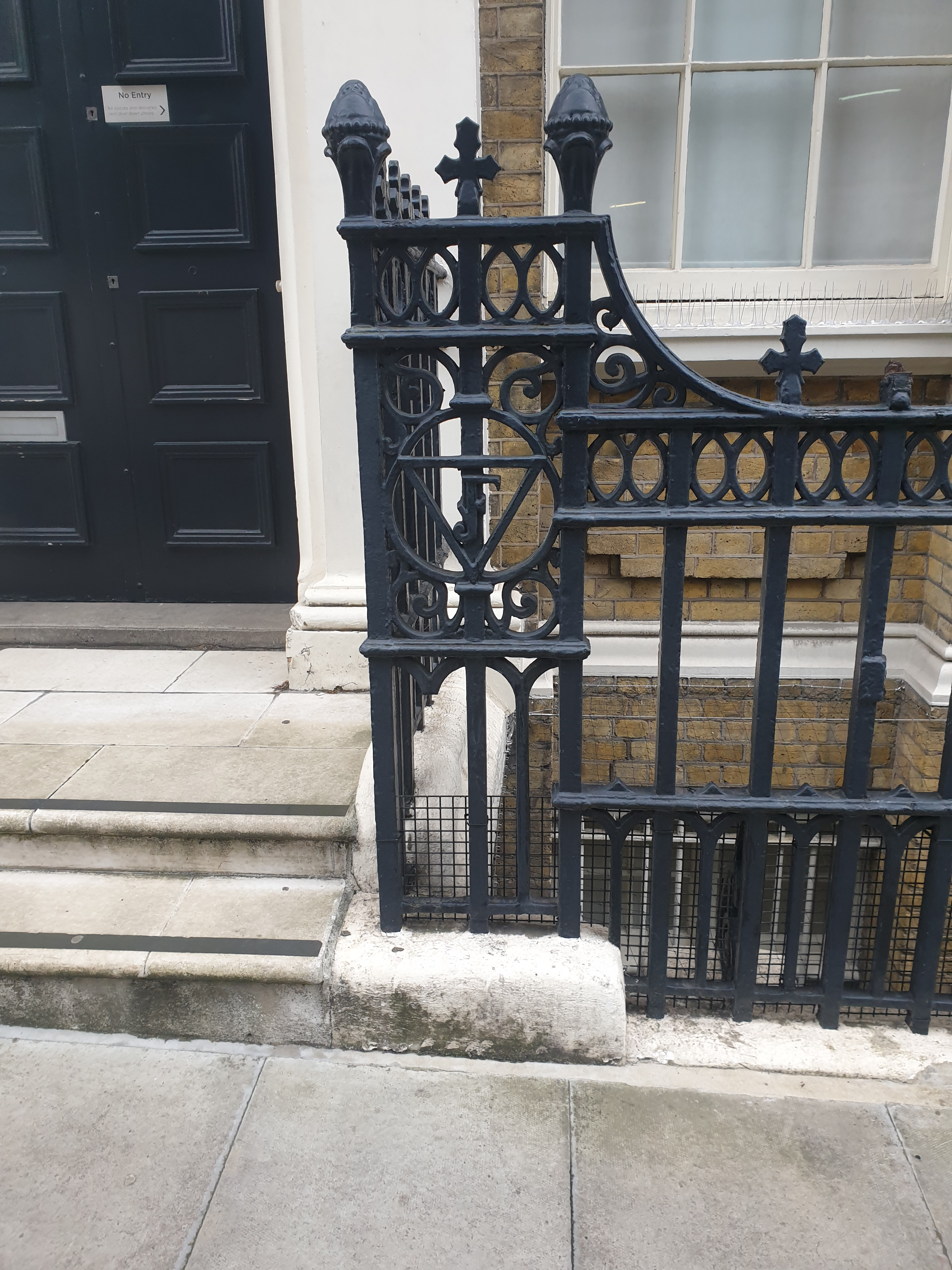

Figgins' foundry moved to 3–7 Ray Street, Clerkenwell in 1865, and adjacent buildings on Farringdon Road. The building survives, and is also Grade II listed as one of the few surviving type foundry buildings in London. It still retains the original cast iron railings bearing the monogram VJF (Vincent & James Figgins). For some years the headquarters of Guardian Unlimited, as of 2017 it is the headquarters of Company Pictures. Besides type the company also made a boxed Kriegsspiel set in type metal. While Figgins' display types were influential in design, the types themselves were little used by the late nineteenth century: from the mid-century larger metal types were largely displaced in use by pantograph-engraved wood type, being much lighter and easier to handle, although the company continued to hold the matrices into the 1950s.

By the late nineteenth century it was clear that for large-run printing of body text the future was hot metal typesetting, which cast fresh new type for each printing job, and in the case of the Linotype machine cast each line in rigid blocks. In 1897 James Figgins commented "the Lino is ruining us entirely". The styles of Figgins' work also became less popular around the beginning of the twentieth century, with new Art Nouveau-influenced display type designs and greater interest in the styles of earlier centuries for text typefaces.

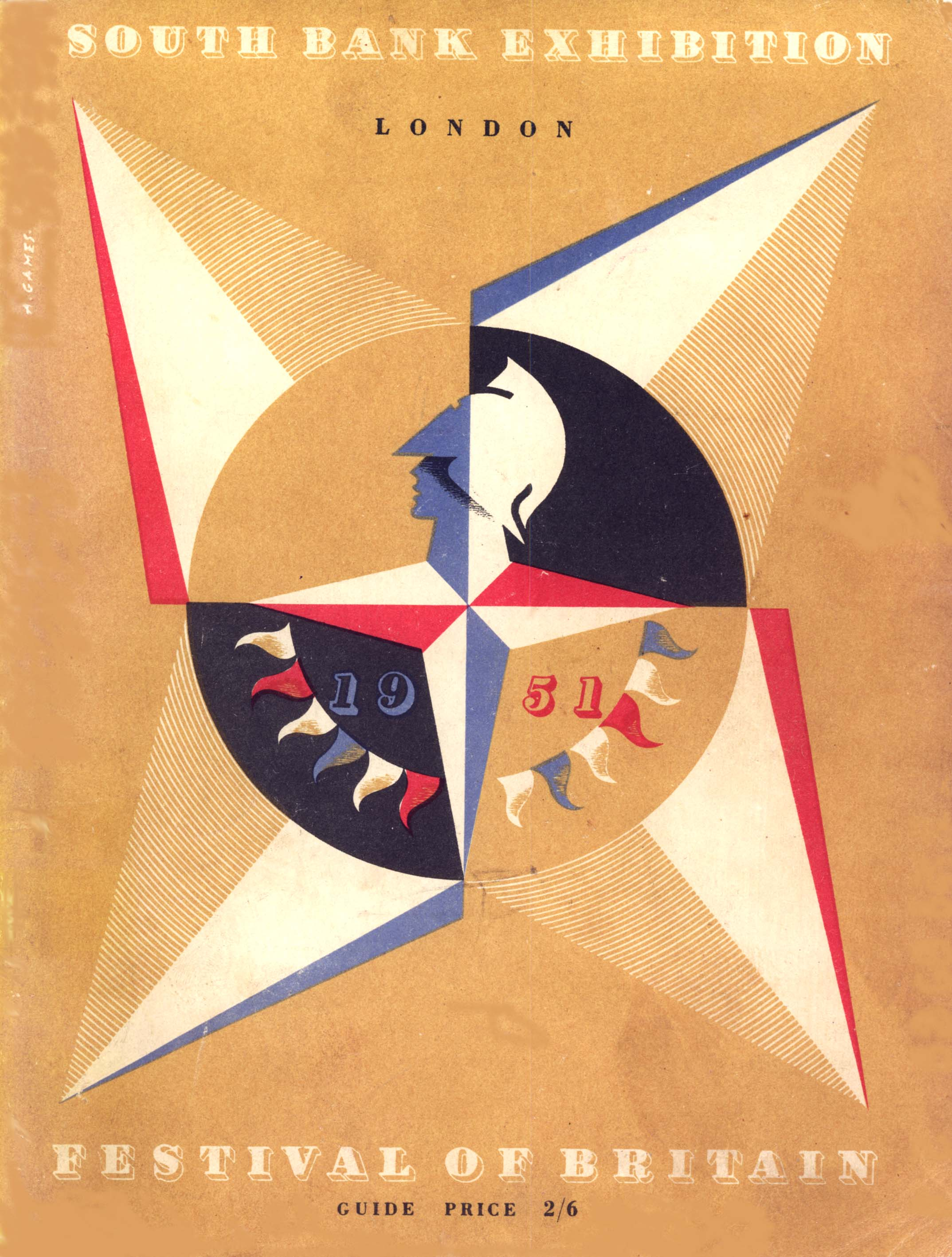
Abram Games' Festival of Britain poster shows the revival of interest in nineteenth-century typography as part of the Victoriana revival.

However, there was a attracted attention from the Victoriana (Note: Name used for convenience. Figgins' retirement was the year before Victoria came to the throne, 1837.) revival of interest in nineteenth-century typography from the 1930s onwards, with coverage of his work from Nicolete Gray and use of nineteenth-century styles by figures such as Robert Harling and John Betjeman. (Note: Gray's Nineteenth-Century Ornamented Types and Title Pages (1938) notably increased interest in the styles of the period; it was released in an expanded edition in 1977 with many illustrations and incorporating more recent research, although several authors have cautioned about the limitations even of the expanded version.) These styles were also used in the design of the post-war Festival of Britain.

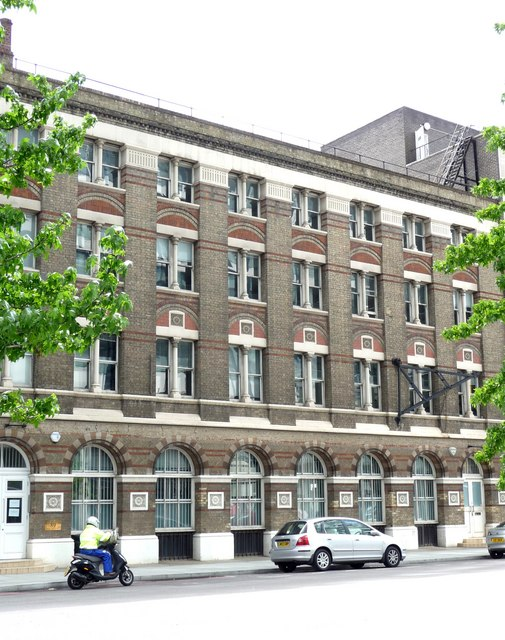
Stevens, Shanks & Sons, the last company to own Figgins' materials, was based in this building at 89 Southwark Street.

In 1907 Figgins' company passed to James Figgins' nephew, R. H. Stevens, and by 1909 it had moved to 89 Southwark Street, also listed. In 1933 it merged with another typefounding company, P. M. Shanks and Co., to form the new company Stevens, Shanks & Sons Ltd., which carried on as a going but slowly declining business casting metal type into the 1970s.

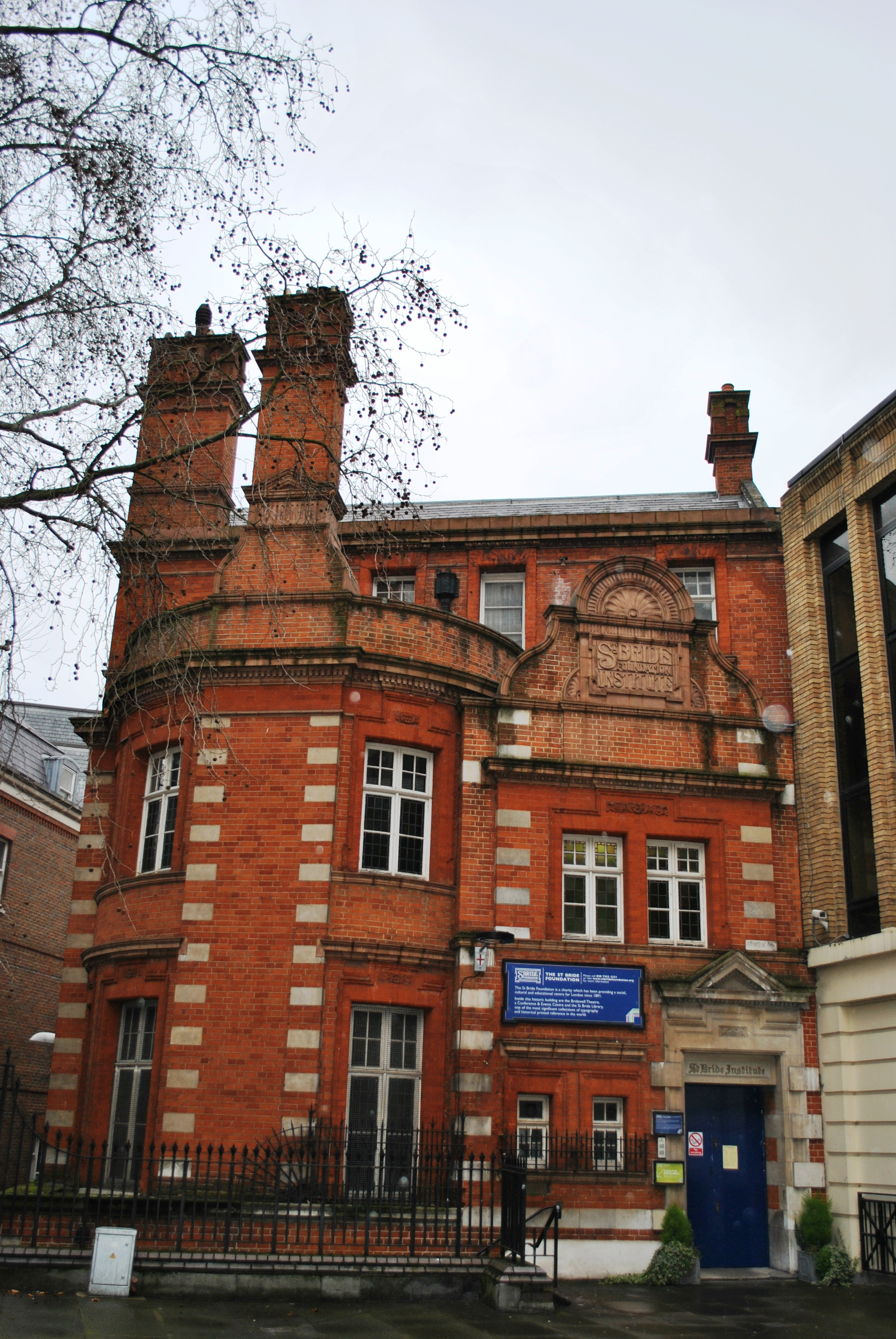
Some of Figgins' materials survive at the St Bride Printing Library.

The materials of Figgins' foundry were acquired by St Bride Library, London, in 1968–73, along with others from Stevens Shanks, through the work of James Mosley, then its librarian. Mosley briefly worked at Stevens Shanks in the 1950s and has written articles and given talks on Figgins' work. According to Mosley some of the largest matrices were sold for scrap by the 1950s, and some damaged by unwise attempts to cast type from them in the twentieth century using high-pressure modern casting equipment, but many of Figgins' materials are extant and have been used for research, for example by the digital font company Commercial Type and its co-founder Paul Barnes.

Numerous digital fonts have been published based on Figgins' work.
