= Joseph Jackson (typefounder) =

British engraved (1733–1792)

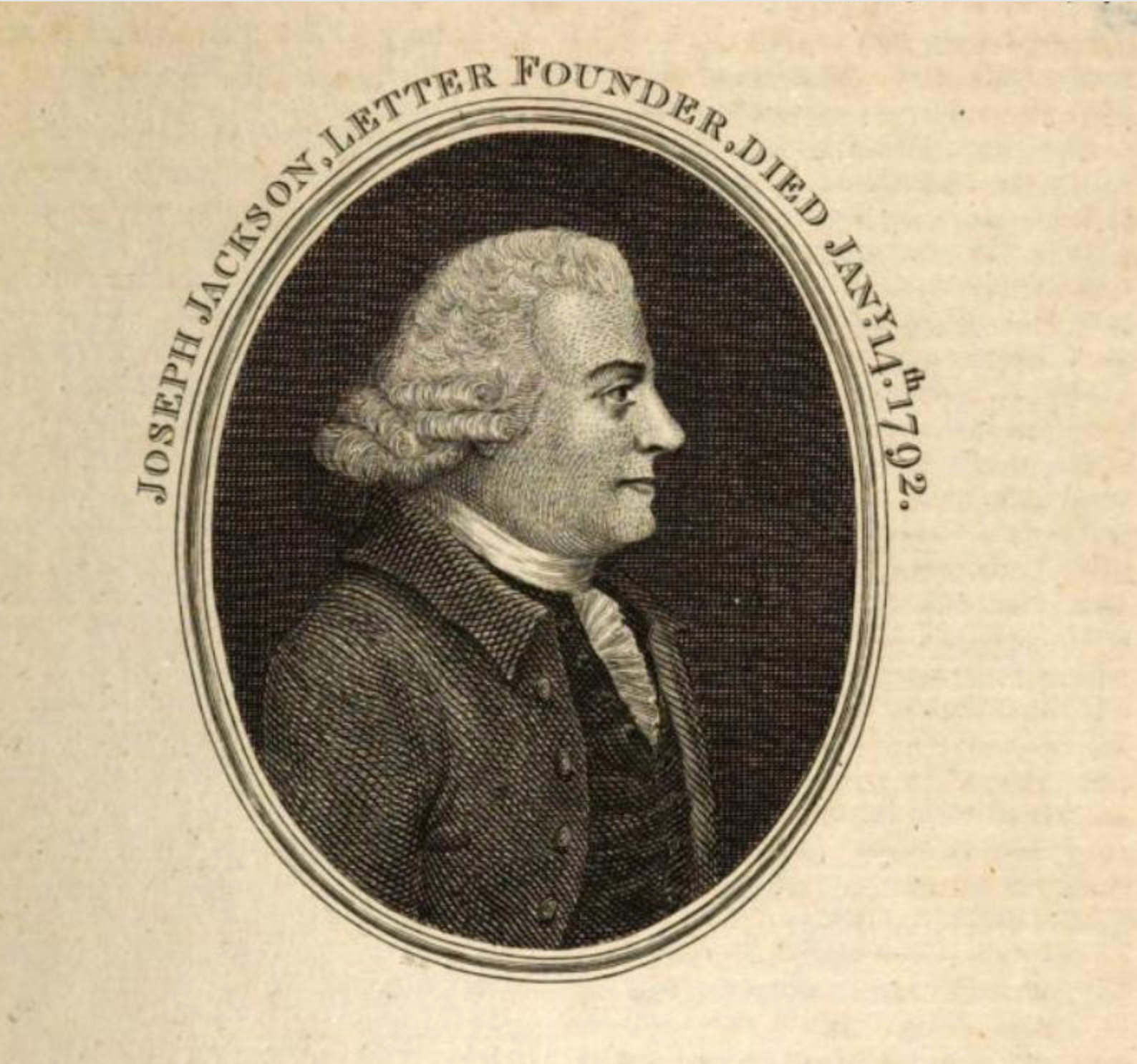
A portrait of Joseph Jackson. The lettering shown is part of the engraving, not his typefaces.

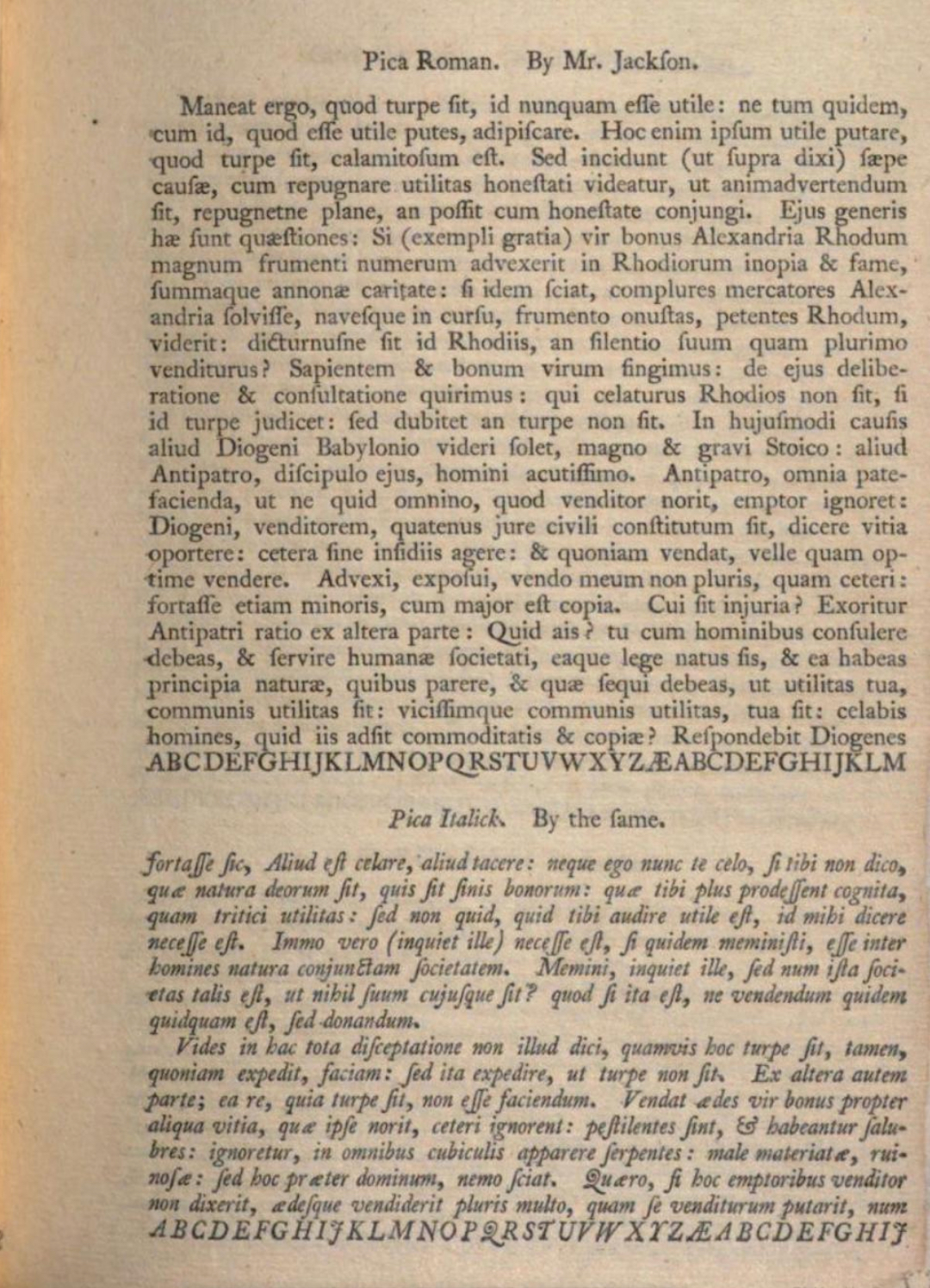
A 12 pt. roman and italic type cut by Joseph Jackson, shown in a specimen book from c. 1770

Joseph Jackson (1733 – 14 January 1792) was a British engraver and typefounder who cut, cast and sold metal type. His foundry was based at Salisbury Square in London. He employed Vincent Figgins as an apprentice. He was in poor health towards the end of his life, but left a considerable fortune. He was also deacon of the Church of Christ, Barbican. He married first Elizabeth (d. 1783) and then Mary (d. 14 Sept 1792). As he was childless, on his death, his estate mostly left to his fourteen nephews and nieces and his type foundry was taken over by William Caslon III. He was buried at Spa Fields Chapel; a sermon was preached on his death by John Towers. His tombstone described him as "a truly honest man and a good Christian ... universally respected".
