= St Bride Library =

Library in London for printing and typography

Coordinates: 51°30′48.5″N 0°6′18″W

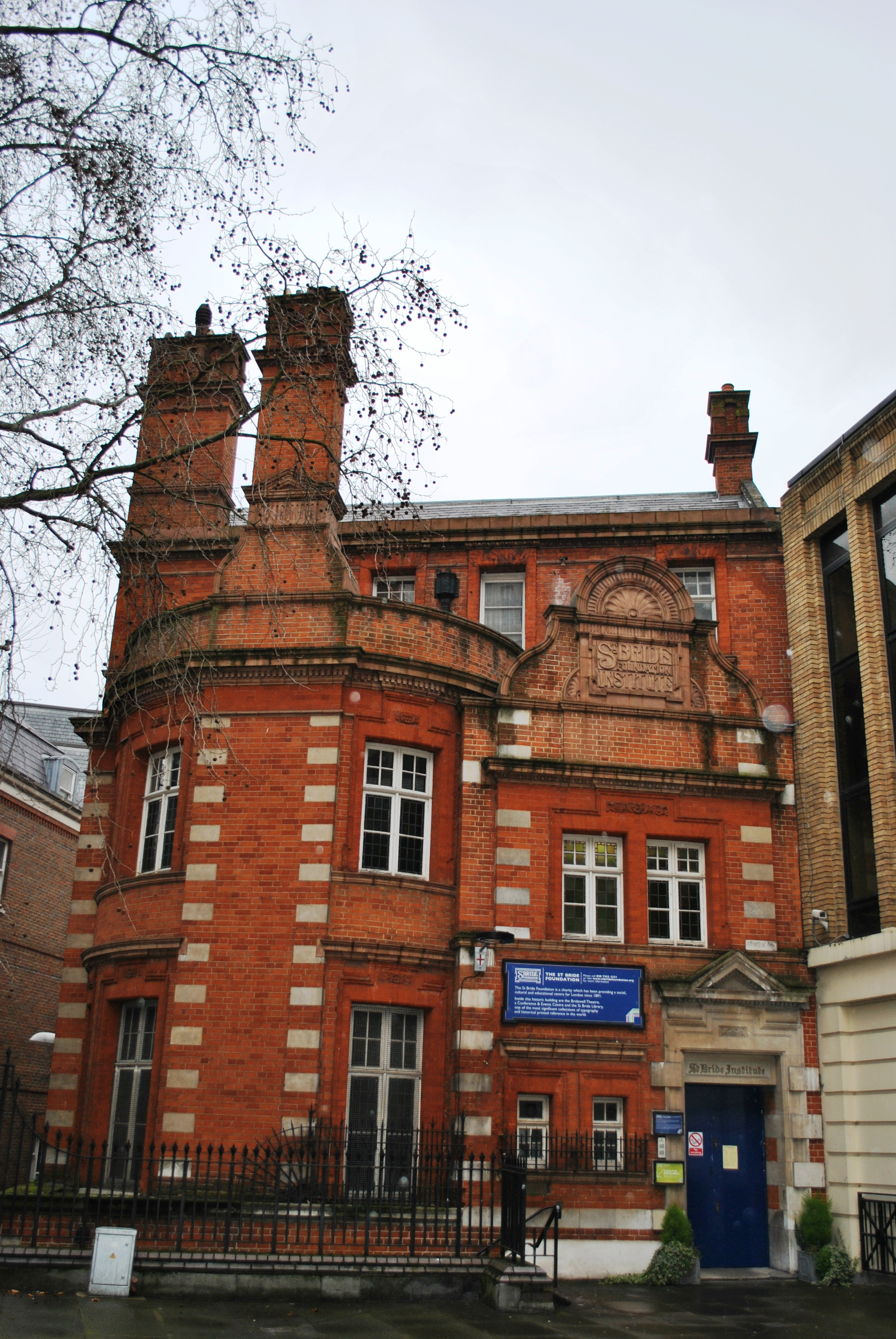
St Bride Library

St Bride Library (formerly known as St Bride Printing Library and St Bride Typographical Library) is a library in London primarily devoted to printing, book arts, typography and graphic design. The library is housed in the St Bride Foundation Institute in Bride Lane, London EC4, a small street leading south of Fleet Street near its intersection with New Bridge Street, in the City of London. It is centrally located in the area traditionally synonymous with the British Press and once home to many of London's newspaper publishing houses. The Library is named after the nearby church, St Bride's Church, the so-called "Cathedral of Fleet Street". The Bridewell Theatre is the theatre attached to the Foundation.

St Bride Library opened on 20 November 1895 as a technical library for the printing school and printing trades. The library remained, as the school relocated in 1922 to become what is now known as the London College of Communication. The library's collection has grown to incorporate a vast amount of printing-related material numbering about 65,000 books and pamphlets, in addition to back issues of some 3,600 serial publications and numerous artefacts. Among its extensive collection the library houses: an Eric Gill collection, a William Addison Dwiggins collection, a Beatrice Warde collection, types of the Oxford University Press, and punches of the Caslon and Figgins foundries. Much of the non-book material was acquired by long-serving librarian James Mosley between 1956 and 2000.

No charge is made for access to the reading room but a fee of £1 per item is levied for titles retrieved from closed access storage. The limited Reading Room study space means that potential visitors must email the library in advance of their visit to ensure that they may be accommodated on open days.

A rolling programme of talks, events and exhibitions runs throughout the year, with the exception of high summer, with most lectures taking place in the Bridewell Hall but also via live online Zoom presentations. Funds raised through these functions are used to support the ongoing work of the library and letterpress printing workshop. Details of current events may be found at Events Archive

A wayzgoose (traditional printers' fair) is held in late April or early May each year to raise funds for the library. The 2026 event took place on Sunday 10 May between 11am and 4pm. More than 30 traders offered private press books, letterpress-printed ephemera, new and second-hand printing type, paper, card and printing bric-a-brac. Refreshments are available throughout the day at each wayzgoose.

== See also ==
- London College of Communication – Constituent college of the University of the Arts London
- History of British newspapers – Dates to the 17th century
