= Bridewell Theatre =

Theatre in London

Coordinates: 51.5135°N 0.1050°W

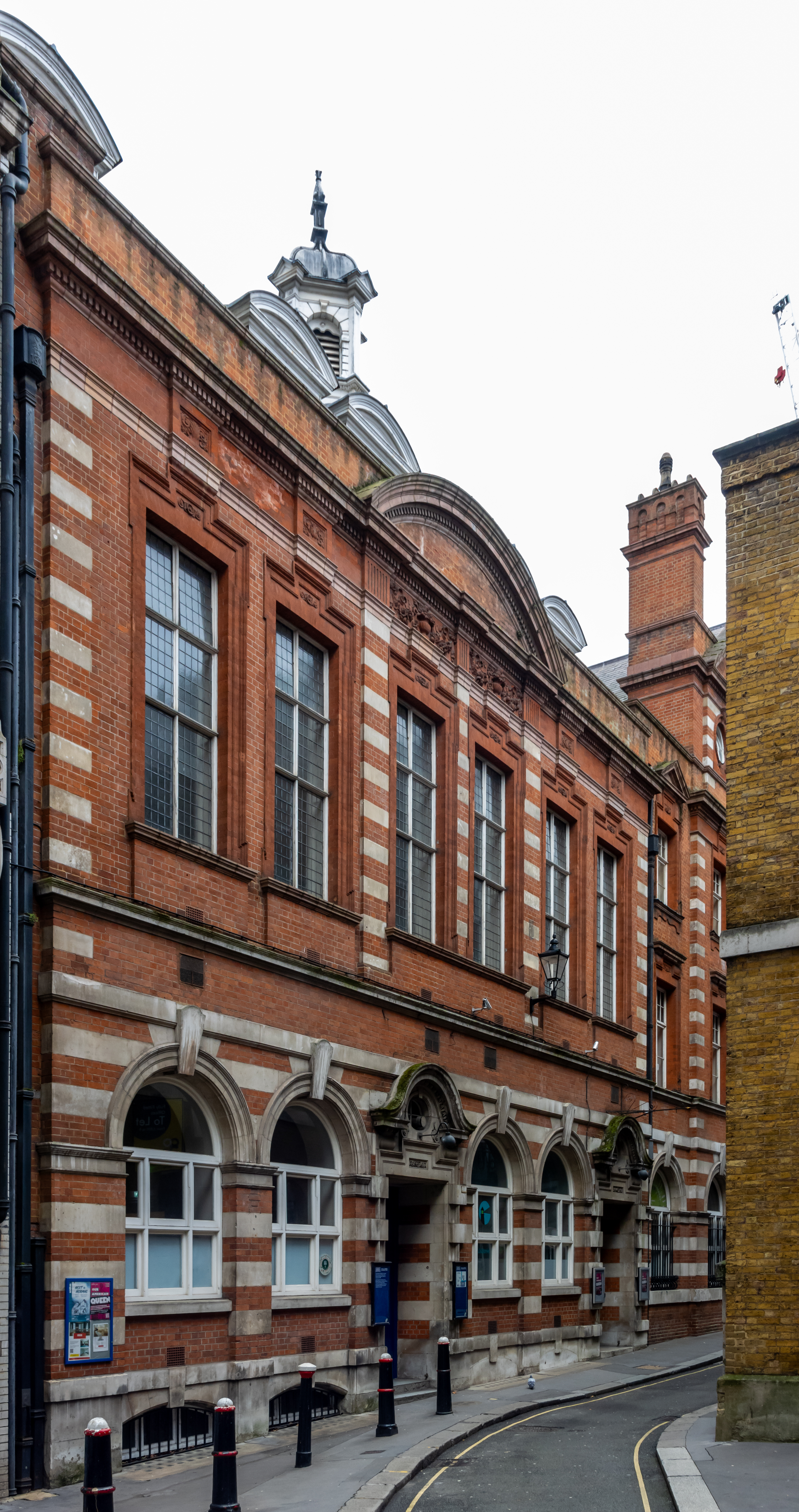
The Bridewell Theatre, Bride Lane, London

Bridewell Theatre is an Off-West End theatre in Blackfriars, London, operated as part of the St Bride Foundation Institute, named after nearby St Bride's Church on Fleet Street. Established in 1994 by Carol Metcalfe after being converted from a disused swimming pool, it became a venue and company hosting fringe theatre productions in central London. Formerly occupied by the Bridewell Theatre's own theatre company, it became involved in the development and introduction of Stephen Sondheim's works in the UK, facilitating the world premiere of his production Saturday Night in 1997.

In 2004, the theatre faced closures after struggling to fund productions in such a small theatre. However, money raised by an appeal to its audience plus funding provided by the Corporation of London and Arts Council England helped the theatre to sign a new lease. Since 2012, the Bridewell's resident theatre company has been Sedos (Stock Exchange Operatic and Dramatic Society), an amateur dramatics society.

The theatre is also used by a number of other London amateur dramatic societies, including The Rollers Theatre Company, Tower Theatre, Centre Stage London and Geoids Musical Theatre producing full-scale musicals like Spring Awakening, Bonnie and Clyde, Little Shop of Horrors and Holiday Inn.
