= Skeleton Antique =

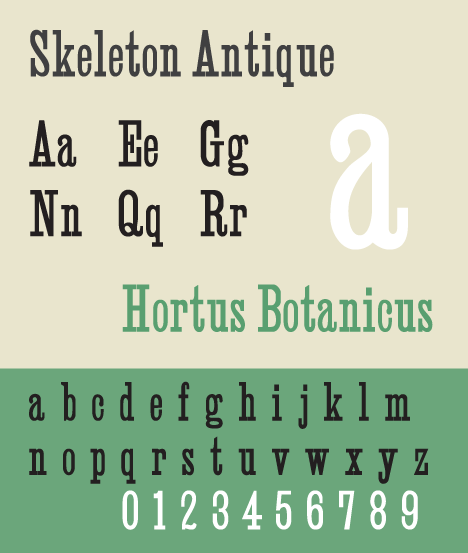
- Category: Serif
- Classification: Slab serif
- Designer(s): William Hamilton Page
- Foundry: William H. Page Wood Type Company; Hamilton Manufacturing Company
- Date released: 1865

Skeleton Antique is a slab serif wooden letterpress typeface designed by William Hamilton Page and first shown in his company's 1865 catalog. The face is nearly monoline in its stroke width and lacks the over-ornamentation typical of both Page's faces and of other nineteenth century letterpress types.
