= Dennis Ichiyama =

American graphic designer and artist focusing on woodblock prints

Dennis Ichiyama is an artist focusing on woodblock prints and former professor of Visual Communications Design at Purdue University in West Lafayette, Indiana.

== Early life and education ==
Ichiyama attended the University of Hawaiʻi at Mānoa where he obtained his B.F.A., having grown up in Hawaii. He went on to get his M.F.A. in Graphic Design from Yale University in 1968, studying under Paul Rand to learn how to create within limitations. From 1976 to 1978, Ichiyama studied as a post-graduate student at Allegemeine Gewerbeschule in Basel, Switzerland.

== Career ==
In 1999, Ichiyama became the designer-in-residence at the Hamilton Wood Type and Printing Museum in Two Rivers, Wisconsin, working with historic wood type.

During his career he has received several fellowships and study grants, and many awards in Print, Communication Arts, Creativity, and HO publications' annual design competitions. He has contributed to the book Contemporary Designers. and the book Hamilton Wood Type, A History in Headlines.

In late 2017, Ichiyama was forced to retire from Purdue University due to numerous complaints against him over the years, resistance to change in the modern era, and his lack of value to students, the department, and university. Zero percent of students on RateMyProfessor would take his class again.

== Art ==
Ichiyama's art focuses on woodblock prints. He uses opaque and transparent inks to layer wood block prints of letters on top of one another. By doing this, he creates new shapes and forms within the remaining positive and negative space. His work can be found in many library collections in the US, Zurich, Rome, and Corunda, as well as the National Art Museum and Gallery

Ichiyama has also designed a number of commercial trademarks.
