= Paula Scher =

American graphic designer and painter

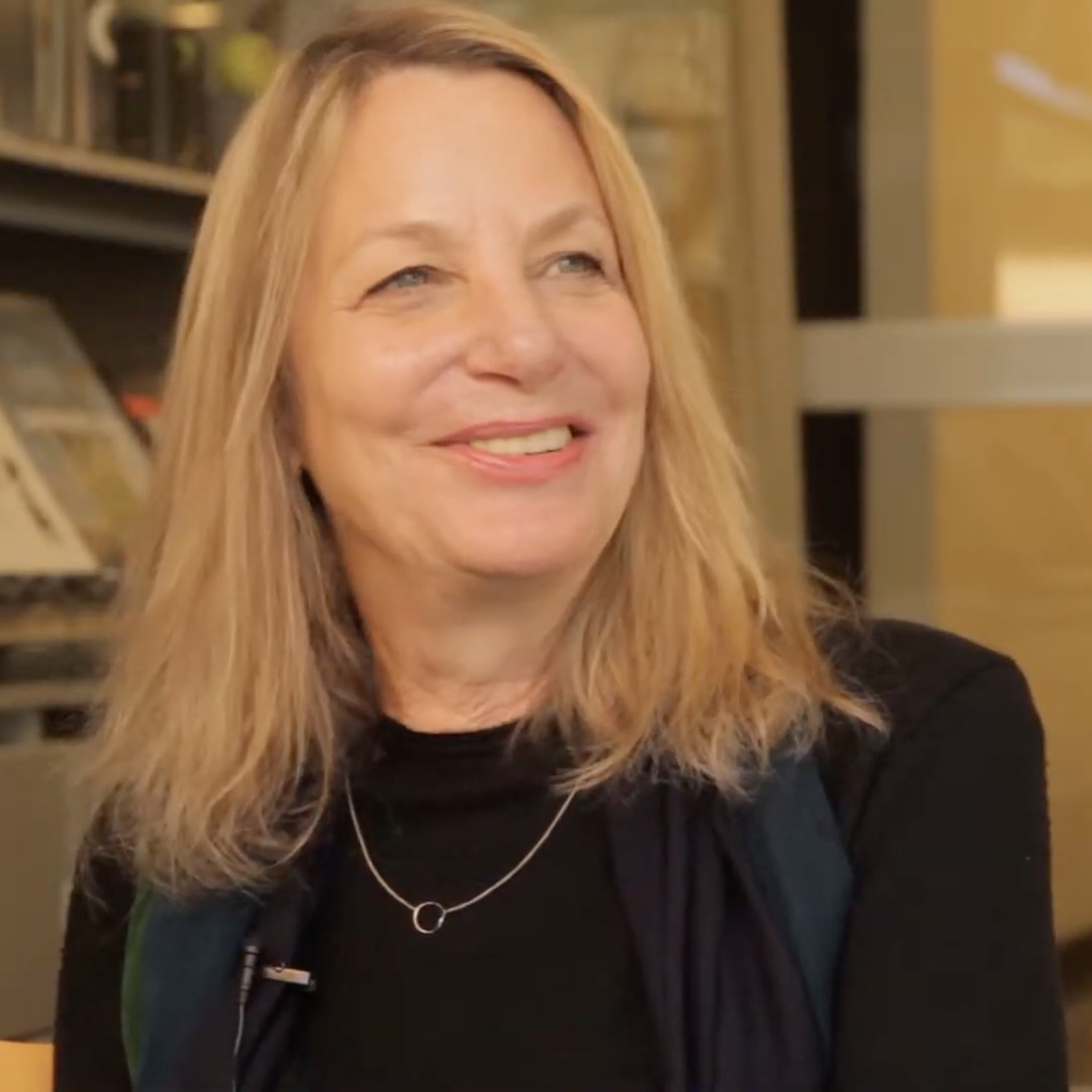
- Born: October 6, 1948 (age 78); Washington, D.C., U.S.
- Education: Tyler School of Art (BA, 1970)
- Known for: Graphic designer, painter, author and educator
- Spouse: Seymour Chwast

Paula Scher (born October 6, 1948) is an American graphic designer, painter, and design educator. She is a partner at the design firm Pentagram, which she joined in 1991. She began her career as an art director in the 1970s and early 1980s, gaining recognition for her eclectic approach to typography, which became highly influential.

== Education ==
Scher studied at the Tyler School of Art, in Elkins Park, Pennsylvania and earned a bachelor of fine arts degree in 1970.

== Life and career ==
Scher moved to New York City and took her first job as a layout artist for Random House's children's book division.

=== CBS Records ===
In 1972, she was hired by CBS Records in the advertising and promotions department. After two years, she left CBS Records to pursue a more creative endeavor at a competing label, Atlantic Records, where she became the art director, designing her first album covers. A year later, Scher returned to CBS as an art director for the cover department. During her eight years at Atlantic Records, she was credited with designing as many as 150 album covers a year. Some of those iconic album cover designs include Boston (Boston), Eric Gale (Ginseng Woman), Leonard Bernstein (Poulenc Stravinsky), Bob James (H), Bob James and Earl Klugh (One on One), Roger Dean and David Howells (The Ultimate Album Cover Album), and Jean-Pierre Rampal and Lily Laskin (Sakura: Japanese Melodies for Flute and Harp). Her designs were recognized with four Grammy nominations. Her work during this time was noted for its eclectic use of typography. She is also credited with reviving historical typefaces and design styles.

=== Russian constructivism ===
She left Atlantic Records to work on her own in 1982. Scher developed a typographic solution based on Art Deco and Russian constructivism, which incorporated outmoded typefaces into her work. The Russian constructivism had provided Scher inspiration for her typography; she did not copy the early constructivist style, but used its vocabulary of form on her works.

=== Koppel and Scher ===
In 1984 she co-founded Koppel and Scher with editorial designer and fellow Tyler graduate Terry Koppel. During the seven years of their partnership, she produced identities, packaging, book jackets, and advertising, including the famous Swatch poster.

=== Pentagram ===
In 1991, after the studio suffered from the recession and Koppel took a position as creative director at Esquire, Scher began consulting and joined Pentagram as a partner in the New York office. Since then, she has been a principal at the New York office of the Pentagram design consultancy, where she has developed identity and branding systems, promotional materials, environmental graphics, packaging, and publication designs for a broad range of clients, including Bloomberg, Microsoft, Bausch + Lomb, Coca-Cola, Shake Shack, The New School, the Museum of Modern Art, the Sundance Institute, the High Line, Jazz at Lincoln Center, the Metropolitan Opera, the New York City Ballet, the New York Philharmonic, the New Jersey Performing Arts Center, the United States Holocaust Memorial Museum, the Philadelphia Museum of Art, and the New York City Department of Parks and Recreation.

=== Educator ===
In 1992, Scher began her career as a design educator, teaching at the School of Visual Arts in New York City. She has served as a faculty member in the MFA Design program for over two decades, with a focus on typography and brand identity, along with holding teaching positions at the Cooper Union, Yale University and the Tyler School of Art.

=== Writing ===
Scher has contributed to numerous issues of Print. Her first Print cover was with her friend Steven Heller. Together, they created a parody issue in 1985, a genealogy chart of graphic design.

Scher has authored several books, including the 2002 Make it Bigger (New York: Princeton Architectural Press. ISBN 1-56898-332-8) based on her experience as a designer. In 2011, the Swedish Hall of Femmes project published a book focused on and interviewing Scher: Hall of Femmes: Paula Scher.

=== Film and television ===
Scher was interviewed for the 2007 Helvetica film, where she discussed her dislike of Helvetica. Scher was profiled in the first season of the 2017 Netflix docuseries Abstract: The Art of Design.

== Branding and identity systems ==
=== The Public Theater ===
Paula Scher on a conference at Higher School of Design La Rioja, Logroño

In 1994, Scher was the first designer to create a new identity and promotional graphics system for The Public Theater, a program that became the turning point of identity in designs that influence much of the graphic design created for theatrical promotion and for cultural institutions in general.

Based on the challenge to raise public awareness and attendance at the Public Theater, along with trying to appeal to a more diverse demographic, Scher created a graphic language that reflected street typography and graffiti-like juxtaposition. In 1995, Scher and her Pentagram team created promotional posters for the Public Theater's production of Savion Glover's Bring in 'da Noise, Bring in 'da Funk featuring typography inspired by wood type, used throughout the Public Theater's identity. These posters were inspired by Rob Roy Kelly's American Wood Types and Victorian theater posters, and combined disparate wood typefaces, silhouetted photographs, and vibrant, flat colors. Scher limited use of colors to two or three, while highlighting the play title and Public Theater logo. The design was intended to appeal to a broad audience, especially to those who had not been familiar with the theater.

From 1993 to 2005, Scher worked closely with George C. Wolfe, The Public's producer, and Oskar Eustis, who joined as artistic director during the 50th anniversary in 2005, on the development of posters, ads, and distinct identities. As part of the anniversary campaign, the Public Theater logo was redrawn using the font Akzidenz Grotesk. The word "theater" was dropped from the logotype, and emphasis was placed on the word "Public". By 2008, the identity was revised with a font called Knockout, created by Hoefler & Frere-Jones.

The Public Theater posters:

- Bring in 'da Noise, Bring in 'da Funk, Public Theater poster/Pentagram: Paula Scher/USA, 1995
- Bring in 'da Noise, Bring in 'da Punch, On-Broadway poster/Pentagram: Paula Scher/USA, 1996
- Bring in 'da Noise, Bring in 'da Funk, Final Season/Pentagram: Paula Scher/USA, 1997
- The Public Theater's Season Print Ads, Rendered in the New Identity/Pentagram: Paula Scher/USA, 1994
- HIM poster/Pentagram: Paula Scher/USA, 1994
- The Diva is Dismissed/Pentagram: Paula Scher/USA, 1994
- Fucking A, A Contemporary Take on The Scarlet Letter, poster/Pentagram: Paula Scher/USA, 2002

==== New York Shakespeare Festival in Central Park ====
In 1994, Scher created the first poster campaign for the New York Shakespeare Festival in Central Park production of The Merry Wives of Windsor and Two Gentlemen of Verona, and was borrowed from the tradition of old-fashioned English theater style. This laid the foundation for the new overall identity and visual language that came to define the Public Theater for the rest of the decade and beyond. The designs for the Shakespeare in the Park campaign were seen across New York City, including buses, subways, kiosks, and billboards.

Scher's Shakespeare in the Park campaign had become a seasonal tradition in the city. The identity has progressed over the years, and the Public Theater logo was redesigned in 2005 and 2008. The campaign in 2008 for the productions of Hamlet and Hair used the strict 90 ° angles of a De Stijl-inspired grid, a pattern in Manhattan's streetscape. The identity is like New York City itself, constantly evolving.

In 2010, Scher designed the New York Shakespeare Festival in Central Park poster, which presented powerful productions of The Winter's Tale and The Merchant of Venice, starring Al Pacino as Shylock. Scher's festival promotional campaign focused on the reminiscent language in both plays by pulling lines from each production to meet in a dimensional expressive of words and typography. This campaign was awarded for Print Regional Design Annual 2011.

New York Shakespeare Festival in Central Park posters:

- New York Shakespeare Festival in Central Park: The Merry Wives of Windsor and Two Gentlemen of Verona – the first project Scher did for the Public Theater / Pentagram: Paula Scher/USA, 1994
- New York Shakespeare Festival in Central Park poster: The Tempest and Troilus and Cressida /Pentagram: Paula/USA, 1995
- New York Shakespeare Festival in Central Park poster: Henry V and Timon of Athens / Pentagram: Paula/USA, 1996
- New York Shakespeare Festival in Central Park poster: On the Town and Henry/Pentagram: Paula/USA, 1997
- New York Shakespeare Festival in Central Park poster: Cymbeline and Thornton Wilder's Skin of Our Teeth/Pentagram: Paula/USA, 1998
- New York Shakespeare Festival in Central Park poster: The Taming of the Shrew and Tartuffe/Pentagram: Paula/USA, 1999
- New York Shakespeare Festival in Central Park poster: Winter's Tale and Julius Caesar/Pentagram: Paula/USA, 2000
- New York Shakespeare Festival in Central Park poster: Measure for Measure and The Seagull/Pentagram: Paula/USA, 2001
- New York Shakespeare Festival in Central Park poster: Henry V/ Pentagram: Paula/USA, 2003
- New York Shakespeare Festival in Central Park poster: Much Ado About Nothing/Pentagram: Paula/USA, 2004
- New York Shakespeare Festival in Central Park poster: As You Like It and Two Gentlemen of Verona/Pentagram: Paula/USA, 2005
- New York Shakespeare Festival in Central Park poster: War/Pentagram: Paula/USA, 2006
- New York Shakespeare Festival in Central Park poster: Romeo and Juliet and A Midsummer Night's Dream/Pentagram: Paula/USA, 2007
- New York Shakespeare Festival in Central Park poster: Hamlet and Hair/Pentagram: Paula/USA, 2008

=== The Museum of Modern Art ===
The Museum of Modern Art (MoMA) has a logotype that has become widely recognized. In 1964, the Franklin Gothic No.2 logotype was originally designed by Ivan Chermayeff. By 2004, Matthew Carter had redrawn a new custom typeface named MoMA Gothic. Although MoMA's core identity is a well-developed iconic museum, applications like the web, print, and physical environment have not been unified or visionary like the museum itself. To continually carry the spirit of the institution, the museum hired Pentagram to design a more comprehensive system.

To create a new approach that modernizes the institution's image, Scher designed a complete methodology for the new system to work at any scale, from an exterior banner to a print advertisement in the newspaper. She designed a strong grid to uniform placement of images and types. The artwork is cropped to maximize visual impact, and each quadrant of a page or a banner has a specific function. A particular image is selected as the signature focus for an exhibit and list of upcoming events unrelated to the featured into a text block. The black-on-white logotype is placed in a vertical position whenever possible and always bleeds off an edge.

Julia Hoffman, MoMA's creative director for graphic and advertising, and her internal team have used the new system and brought the system to life in applications from larger banners and subway posters to the website.

MOMA also holds a collection of Scher's work.

=== The Metropolitan Opera ===
Scher and Julia Hoffman designed the new identity for the Metropolitan Opera. The Metropolitan general manager, Peter Gelb, proposed to rebrand the institution and reach wide audiences like the younger generation who had never set foot inside the opera hall. The identity was set in Baskerville and Avenir and the campaign featured a performance of Madama Butterfly. The print ad campaign launched on August 20, 2006, and according to Thomas Michel, the Metropolitan's marketing director, it was a successful sales day in the history of the organization.

=== New York City Ballet ===
Scher designed a new identity and promotional campaign for the New York City Ballet (NYCB), one of the largest and well-known dance companies, founded in 1933 by Lincoln Kirstein and George Balanchine. Scher designed with Lisa Kitchenberg of Pentagram and the NYCB's Luis Bravo, to create an identity that linked the company's legacy and location to a modern and dramatic new aesthetic. The logo was set in the font DIN, which appears slightly stacked on each layer. The palette was composed of black, white and silvery grays, resembling how the buildings of New York appear sometimes. It has a softened transparency and a subtle gradation of color that includes shades of blue blacks, green blacks and red blacks. Scher also cropped the images of City Ballet dancers to create more tension and drama. The new identity and graphics appeared on bus shelter, subway poster, magazines and newspapers ads, in the company's programs and website, and in environmental graphics at the New York State Theater at Lincoln Center, where the company performs.

=== Period Equity ===
Scher worked with associate designer Courtney Gooch to create the identity for Period Equity, a non-profit that is dedicated to providing affordable and safe access to menstrual products in the United States. She worked with Period Equity co-founders, Jennifer Weiss Wolf and Laura Strausfeld, to create the identity. Weiss-Wolf and Strausfeld initially wanted to call their organization "Menstrual Equality", but Scher saw Period Equity as less off-putting. The term "period" is more playful than "menstrual", and allows for more graphic options. When the organization achieves its goal, the name can be shifted to "Equity, Period". This will allow them to later extend their work beyond menstrual inequality into other issues.

Scher used the typeface New Rail Alphabet, designed by Margaret Calvert, for its neutral appearance, but replaced its square-edged punctuation with round. The branding concept puts their wordmark in between two big red dots on a white background. These dots are meant to allude to the idea of periods, but they are used in a clean and modernist style. The identity also uses copy such as "Periods are not luxuries. Period." to play with the theme. The identity is serious enough for legal work, but also loud and fun, which is necessary when discussing a topic that is normally stigmatized and seen as not appropriate to discuss in public.

=== Microsoft: Windows 8 logo ===
In 2012, Scher created a new logo for Windows 8 that takes the logo back to its roots as a window. The logo re-imagines their older four-colour symbol as a more modern geometric shape. Early in the development process, Scher asked Microsoft, "Your name is Windows. Why are you a flag?" Although Microsoft's original logo started as a window, its graphic representation evolved into a flag as computing systems became more powerful. This worked better with the brand, as the name Windows was originally used as a metaphor for seeing into screens.

The logo itself is based on classical perspective drawing rather than computerized perspective. The cross bars on the window stay the same size no matter what the size of the logo is, meaning it must be redrawn for each time it increases in size. The focus on the analogy of perspective was used to convey the idea that Microsoft products are tools for individuals to achieve their goals from their own perspective. The new logo is meant to work with the Metro design language of Windows 8.

== Environmental graphic designs ==
=== New Jersey Performing Arts Center ===
In 2001, Scher designed environmental graphics and a large-scale typographic mural for the Cathedral House, a historic 1941 rectory building owned by New Jersey Performing Arts Center in Newark, New Jersey. The exterior mural design includes words in condensed lettering with black outlines representing programs taught in the building running along the white walls, pipes, and balconies. The project became signature environmental graphics for NJPAC. In June 2022, NJPAC filed an application with Newark Historic Preservation Commission to demolish the structure. At a hearing, architectural historian affiliated with the project testified that painting the brick was “problematic” and the mural diminished integrity of the brick. By September 2022, NJPAC reversed the demolition plans and agreed to save the building’s façade including Scher’s mural.

=== Achievement First Endeavor Middle School ===
For the 2010 expansion and renovation of Achievement First Endeavor Middle School, a charter school in Clinton Hill, Brooklyn, Scher and her team at Pentagram designed environmental graphics with bright colors and typography in Rockwell font in order to help school interiors become a better learning environment. The design was based on Endeavor's teaching philosophy and a series of motivational slogans used by its teachers. Scher enlarged these concepts into super-graphics that help define the interior spaces. The graphics appear as an equations form ("Education = Choice", "Education = Freedom") in the hallways and quotations running around the wall of gymnasium and staircase, to encourage students to do better and create a unique environment of their own.

== Paintings ==
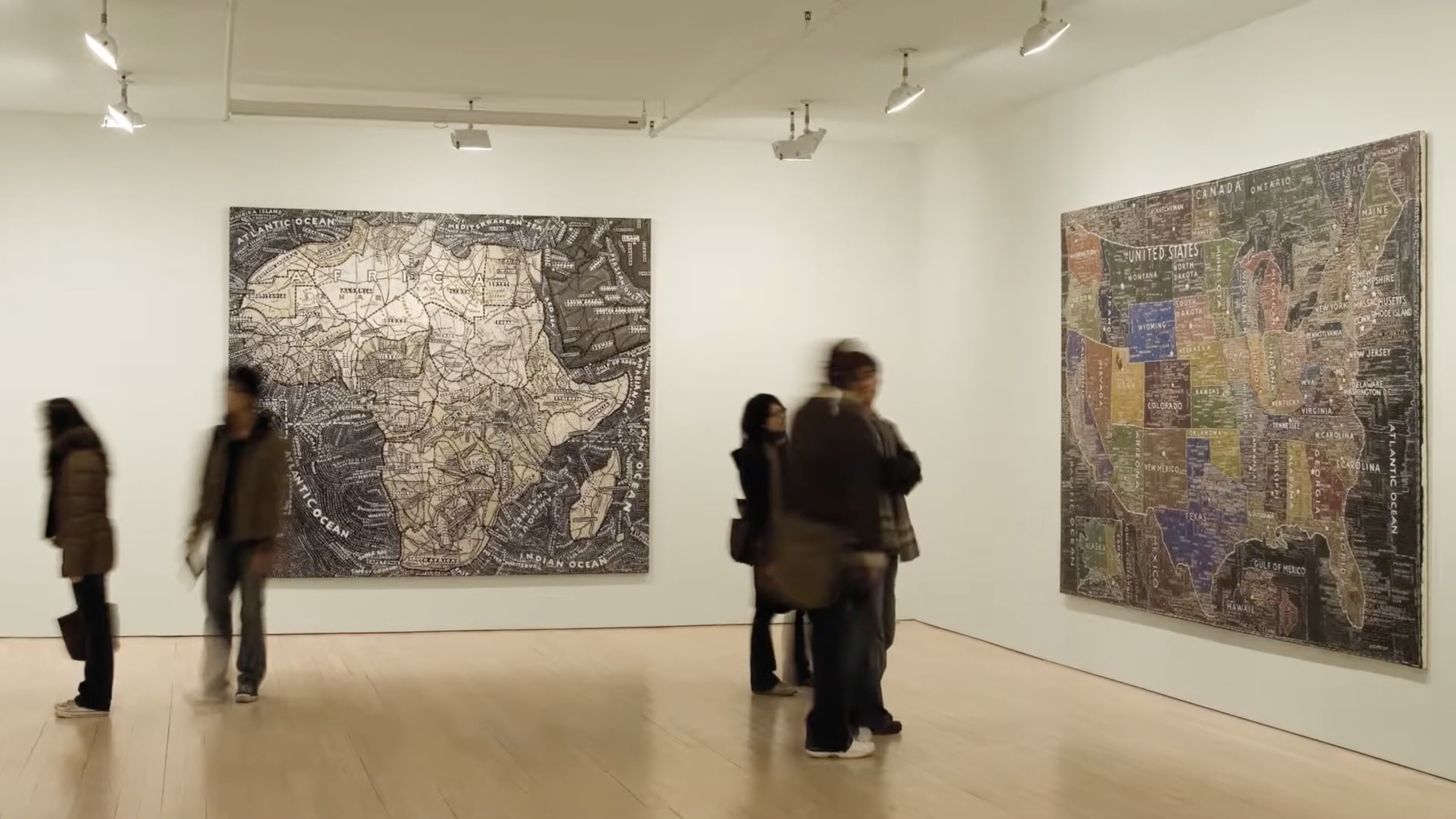
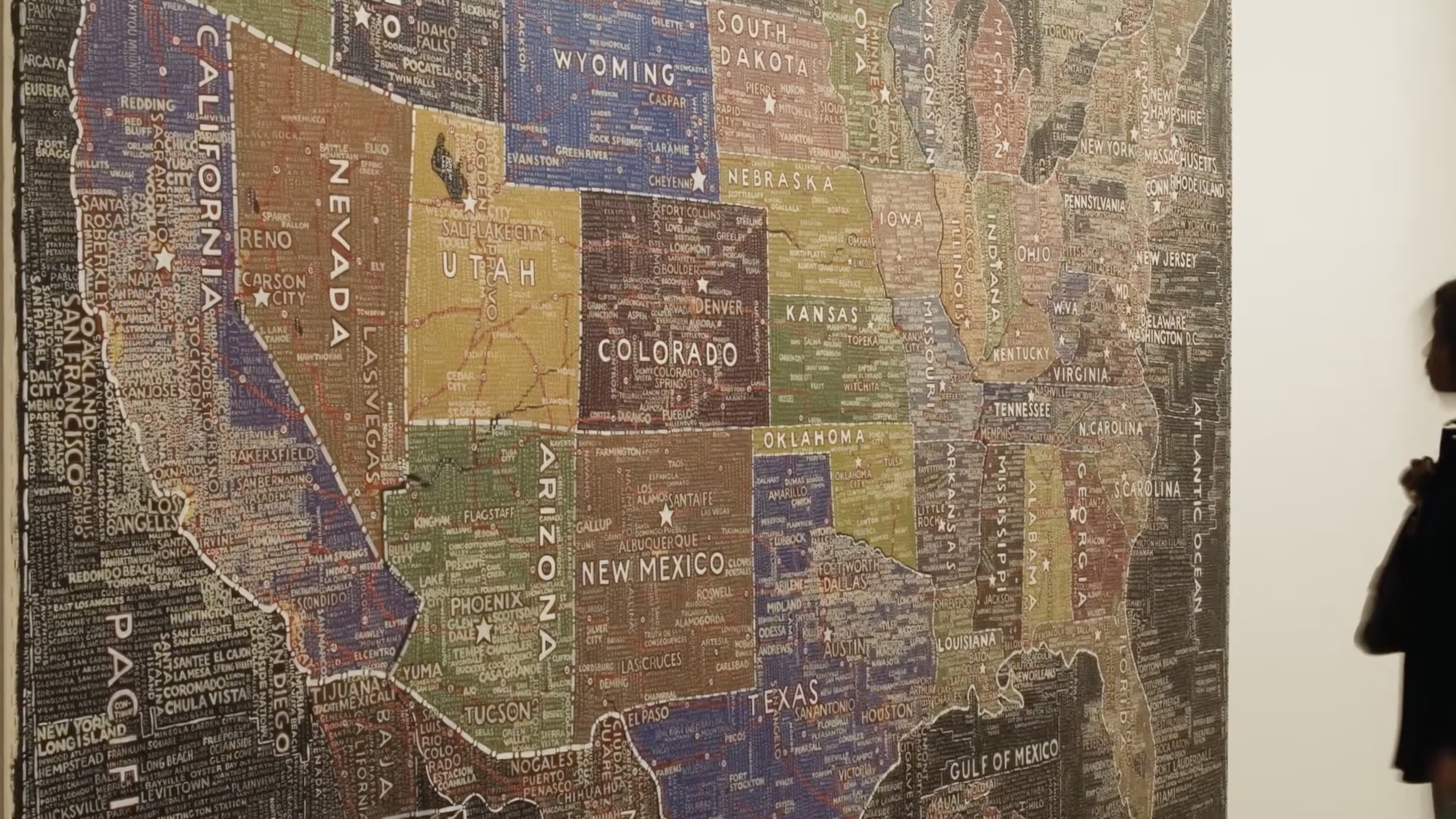
Scher's map paintings

=== The Maps ===
In addition to her design work, Paula Scher is known for cartographic paintings that resemble patchwork quilts, relying on hand-drawn, colorful, word-dense typography depicting a flow of subjective information. She described her paintings as maximalist, stating, "Less is more and more is more. It's the middle that's not a good place."

Scher started painting geographic maps in late 1990s, gaining gallery representation a few years later. Her first solo exhibition as a fine artist was held in 2006 at Maya Stendhal Gallery in New York City. For the show, Scher painted two 9-by-12-foot paintings of maps that contain rich textual detail: lines that represent the separation of political allies or borders dividing enemies, and painted letters and details referencing common stereotypes of countries or regions. For instance, The United States (1999) was painted in blocky white, full with a list of facts that we comprehend when we think about American cities. Africa (2003) is represented in a stark black and white palette, hinting at the continent's colonial past. The land of the red rising sun is represented when we think of Japan (2004). Every piece in the show sold between $40,000 to $135,000. Responding to the success of the exhibition, the gallery decided to extend its initial run for four additional weeks.

She is currently represented by Bryce Wolkowitz Gallery.

=== Limited edition prints of The Maps ===
Scher also exhibited and sold copies of her Maps paintings as screenprint reproductions.

The success of the 2006 show at Maya Stendhal Gallery led Scher to produce silkscreened prints of The World painting that contained large-scale images of cities, states, and continents blanketed with place names and other information. It is full of mistakes, misspellings, and visual allusions to stereotypes of places such as South America, which Scher called "sexy." It was not created to be a reliable map but to convey a sense of places that are “mediated and mangled by Scher's imagination”.

In 2007, Scher created limited edition prints of her NYC Transit and Manhattan paintings, printed on Lanaquarelle watercolor paper, hand-made in the Vosges region of France. Scher portrayed the island of Manhattan as a busy destination crisscrossed by loopy, color-coded subway lines and stations, and included names of famous local neighborhoods. A copy of NYC Transit print is held in the collection of the V&A Museum in London.

In 2008, Maya Stendhal Gallery released a set of 90 hand-pulled screenprints of Scher's China painting. The 48.5 x 40" Lanaquarelle paper prints were made in collaboration with renowned printer Alexander Heinrici. The press release announcing the project stated that Scher's painting depicting the map of China represents the country’s recent rapid economic growth, booming industry, and “superpower status”. Additional copies of the print were produced in 2013.

== Selected exhibitions ==
- 2006 The Maps – Maya Stendhal Gallery, New York City
- 2007 Paula Scher Recent Paintings – Maya Stendhal Gallery, New York City
- 2008 Paula Scher Limited Edition Screenprint Series – Maya Stendhal Gallery, New York City
- 2010 Paula Scher: Maps Screenprints 2006–2010 – Maya Stendhal Gallery, New York City
- 2012 Maps: Paula Scher – Bryce Wolkowitz Gallery, New York
- 2016 U.S.A. – Paula Scher – Bryce Wolkowitz Gallery, New York
- 2019 Paula Scher: Public Theater – Design Manchester 19 at the Manchester School of Art
- 2020 20/20 – Twenty Artworks Celebrating Twenty Year – Bryce Wolkowitz Gallery, New York
- 2023 Type Is Image – Die Neue Sammlung at the Pinakothek der Moderne, Munich

== Personal life ==
In January 1970, Scher met Seymour Chwast when she was a senior at the Tyler School of Art. They met through an interview at Push Pin Studios, arranged by an art director named Harris Lewine, where she took her portfolio to him. In 1973, she and Chwast married, and divorced five years later. They remarried in 1989. Scher and Chwast live and work in New York City.

== Awards and honors ==
She received more than 300 awards from international design associations as well as a series of prizes from the American Institute of Graphic Design (AIGA), The Type Directors Club (NY), New York Art Directors Club and the Package Design Council. She is a select member of Alliance Graphique Internationale (AGI) and her work is included in the collections of New York Museum of Modern Art, the Library of Congress in Washington, D.C., the Museum für Gestaltung, Zurich and the Centre Georges Pompidou.

- American Book Award nomination – 1981 for best book design for The Honeymoon Book: A Tribute to the Last Ritual of Sexual Innocence
- American Book Award nomination – 1981 for best compilation of written and graphic material for The Honeymoon Book: A Tribute to the Last Ritual of Sexual Innocence
- Art Directors Club Hall of Fame – 1998
- Chrysler Award for Innovation in Design – 2000
- AIGA Medal – 2001
- School of Visual Arts – Master Series Award – 2002 for Make It Bigger
- Type Directors Club Medal – 2006
- Print's Regional Design Annual – 2011 for Shakespeare in the Park 2010 campaign, Map Murals for Queens Metropolitan Campus, and Environmental Graphic for Parking Garage at 13–17 East 54th Street
- National Design Award (Cooper Hewitt Smithsonian) – 2013
- Honorary doctorates from Corcoran School of Art, Maryland Institute of Art, Moore College of Art, and Columbus College of Art and Design

== Partial bibliography ==
=== Books by ===
- Scher, Paula (1973). The Brownstone. New York: Pantheon Books. ISBN 9780394824871, a Junior Literary Guild selection
  - Reprinted in 2015 by Princeton Architectural Press. ISBN 978-1616894283
- Scher, Paula (2002). Make it Bigger. New York: Princeton Architectural Press. ISBN 1-56898-332-8
- Scher, Paula (2011). Maps. New York: Princeton Architectural Press. ISBN 978-1-61689-033-9
- Scher, Paula (2020). Paula Scher: Twenty-Five Years at the Public, a Love Story. New York: Princeton Architectural Press. ISBN 9781616898649
- Scher, Paula (2023). Paula Scher: Type is Image. Köln: Verlag der Buchhandlung Walther und Franz König. ISBN 9783753304656

=== Books about ===
- Bouabana, Samira; Tillman Sperandio, Angela (2011). Hall of Femmes: Paula Scher. Oyster Press. ISBN 9789197882736
- Brook, Tony; Shaughnessy, Adrian (editors) (2017). Paula Scher: Works. London: Unit Editions. ISBN 9780995666412

=== Ted Talk ===
- Scher, Paula (2009). Great design is serious, not solemn. TED Talk.

=== Book reviews ===
- Chwast, Seymour; Scher, Paula (May 31, 1998). "Bookend". The New York Times.
- Scher, Paula (2000). "The Queen Of Howdy Doody Dada". Print. 54 (3): 61.

=== Articles ===
- Scher, Paula (April 5, 2007). "Op-Art; DIAGRAM OF A BLOG". New York Times. ProQuest 433554160.
- Potts, Sam (September 13, 2009). "OP-ART; Better Signs of Trouble". New York Times. Gale A207732576.
- Scher, Paula (January 27, 2011). "Who Gives The Best Info? A Short History Of Information Design". Huffington Post. Archived from the original on December 5, 2022.
