= J. E. Hamilton =

American industrialist

- Born: James Edward Hamilton; May 19, 1852; Two Rivers, Wisconsin, U.S.
- Died: July 10, 1940 (aged 88)
- Resting place: Pioneer's Rest Cemetery, Two Rivers, Wisconsin, U.S.
- Occupations: Founder and former President of Hamilton Manufacturing Company

J. E. Hamilton (May 19, 1852 – July 10, 1940) was an American industrialist who was the founder of the Hamilton Manufacturing Company in Two Rivers, Wisconsin which was the largest manufacturer of wood type in the United States.

== Early life ==
Hamilton was born in Two Rivers, Wisconsin to Henry Carter Hamilton and Diantha Smith. Decedents on his mother's side include Samuel Huntington who was a signer of both the Declaration of Independence and the Articles of Confederation, and Major David Huntington who was the first gun maker in America and provided weapons for George Washington's army.

== Hamilton Manufacturing Company ==
In 1878, Hamilton was asked by William Nash, the editor of the local Two Rivers Chronicle, to cut type for a poster Nash needed to print. Nash did not have enough time to order new type and knew of Hamilton's skill with a saw. Hamilton used a foot-power scroll saw to cut the letters, and then mounted them to a block of wood. The type printed so well that he sent samples to area printers and upon receiving orders formed the J. E. Hamilton Holly Wood Type Company.

As the Midwestern United States grew in the late 1800s, print shops and newspapers were established by the new populace. Type made in the Eastern U.S. was too expensive and took too long for delivery for Midwestern printers. Hamilton's location in Wisconsin and cheaper production methods allowed him to service the new printers by providing a product that was "half the price, in the half the time."

On November 1, 1881, Hamilton took on a partner and sold half of his company to Max Katz and renamed the business Hamilton & Katz. Katz retired from the company in 1887 and the Hamilton Manufacturing Company was incorporated on January 1, 1889 with Hamilton as the majority stock holder. By 1891, the company had a workforce of 200 employees and $500,000 worth of business.

The economic and geographic advantages Hamilton had allowed him to dominate the market and acquire the competition. In 1909, he purchased the Tubbs Manufacturing Company in Ludington, Michigan which was the last of his major competitors in business.

== See also ==
- Hamilton Wood Type and Printing Museum
- Thermo Fisher Scientific
- Letterpress printing
- William Hamilton Page
