= William Hamilton Page =

American typographer (1829–1909)

- Born: 1829; Tilton, New Hampshire
- Died: 1909 (aged 79–80); Mystic, Connecticut
- Known for: typography

William Hamilton Page (1829–1909) was a type designer and owner of William Page & Company, a leading manufacturer of wood type for letterpress printing.

== Life and career ==
Page worked as a printer for several newspapers before learning the trade of wood type manufacturing from John Cooley in South Windham, Connecticut. In 1856 he and James Bassett purchased the assets of the defunct H. &. J. Bill & Company and went into partnership as Page & Bassett. In 1859 he withdrew from this partnership and became partners with Samuel Mowry, forming William Page & Company, near Norwich, Connecticut. This firm quickly became the largest and most efficient manufacturer of wooden type in the United States. It was only in the 1880s that a serious rival, the Hamilton Manufacturing Company owned by J.E. Hamilton, emerged. When Page retired in 1891, he sold out to Hamilton for stock in that company, and Page's equipment and stock were consolidated with that of Hamilton in Two Rivers, Wisconsin.

== Typefaces ==
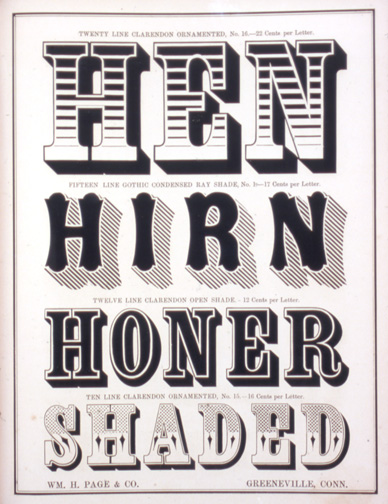
Sample page from Wm. H. Page and Co., Specimens of Wood Type Borders, Rules, &c.

Page was a prolific designer of typefaces, all of them typical of the heavily ornamented style of the mid-nineteenth century. The following types were designed by Page:

- Aetna (1870).
- Antique#7 (1870)
- Antique Tuscan Outline (1859).
- Antique Tuscan#8 (1859); Adobe's virtual type version is called Mesquite.
- Antique Tuscan#11 (1859), also called Gothic Tuscan Condensed; HiH's virtual type version is called Antique Tuscan No. 9.
- Antique XXX Condensed (1859)
- Beveled #142 (1882)
- Celtic Ornamented (1870); Adobe's virtual type version is called Pepperwood.
- Clarendon Ornamented (1859); Adobe's virtual type version is called Rosewood, while the FontMesa version is called Country Western.
- Clarendon XX Condensed (1859)
- Egyptian Ornamented (1870)
- French Antique (1869)
- French Clarendon XXX Condensed (1879); Adobe's virtual type version is called Ponderosa.
- Gothic Tuscan Condensed#2 (1879)
- Gothic Tuscan Pointed (1859); Adobe's virtual type version is called Ironwood,.
- Ionic (1859)
- Latin #129 (1879); Adobe's virtual type version is called Birch.
- Painter's Roman (1870), cut in association with Darius Wells; Adobe's virtual type version is called Juniper.
- Peerless #131 (1879)
- Phanitalian (1879); HiH's virtual type version is called Gothic Tuscan One.
- Skeleton Antique (1865).
- Teutonic (1872).
- #154 (1887).
- #500 (1887).
- #506 (1887).
- #508, #510, #513 (1887); Font Bureau's virtual type versions are called Hamilton.
- #515 (1887); ITC's virtual type version is called ITC Florinda
