= Ichiyama =

Ichiyama (written: 一山) is a Japanese surname. Notable people with the surname include:

- Dennis Ichiyama, American artist
- Linda Ichiyama, American politician
- Mao Ichiyama (一山 麻緒, born 1997), Japanese long-distance runner
