= Rob Roy Kelly =

American graphic design educator

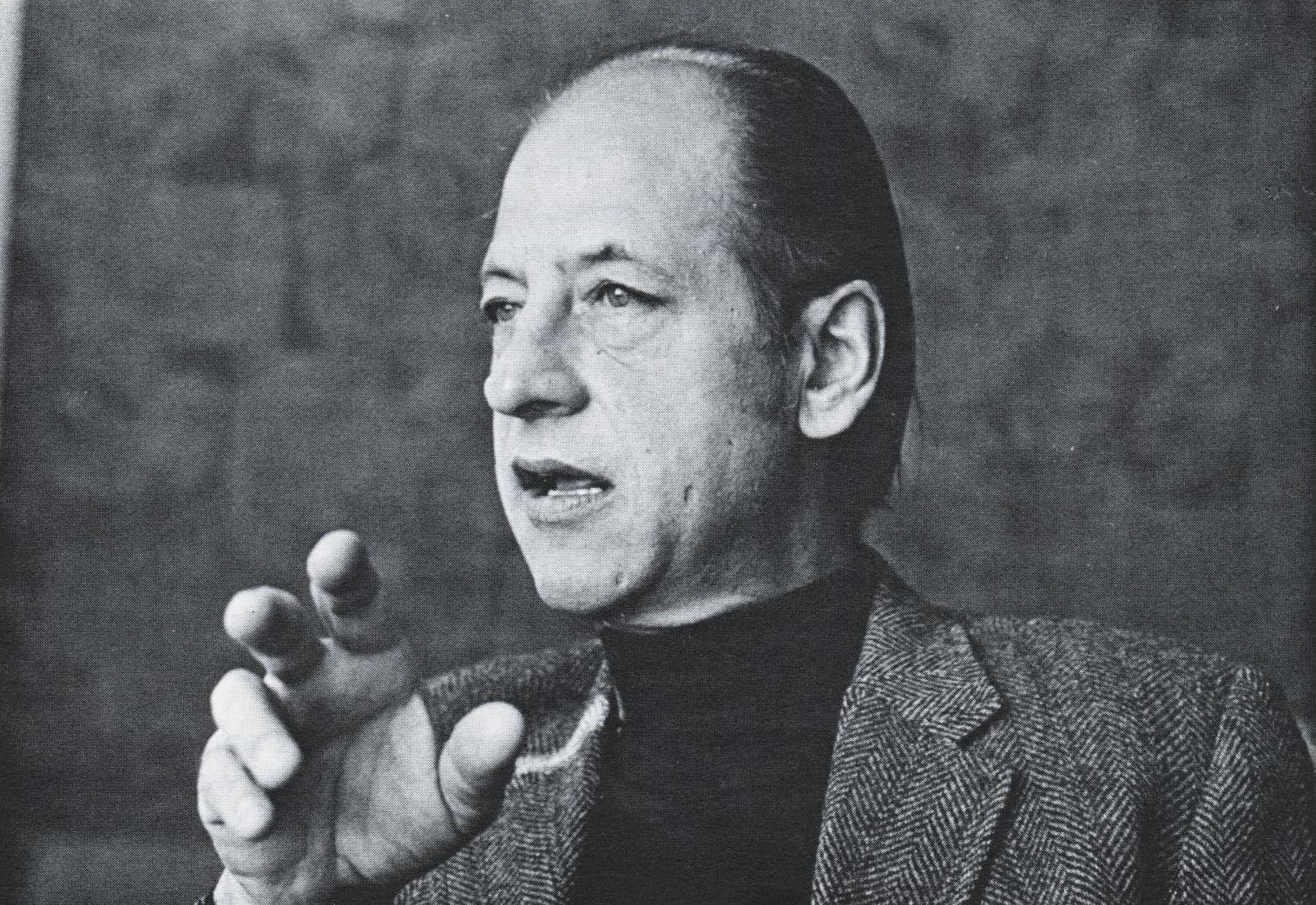
- Kelly circa 1974
- Born: March 15, 1925; Lincoln, Nebraska, U.S.
- Died: January 23, 2004 (aged 78)
- Education: Minneapolis College of Art and Design (BFA); Yale University (MFA)
- Occupation: Graphic designer

Rob Roy Kelly (March 15, 1925 – January 23, 2004) was a design educator who established multiple design programs in the formative years of graphic design education at art schools and universities. Known as a collector and scholar of wood type, Mr. Kelly authored American Wood Type, 1828–1900 (1969). His comprehensive wood type collection now resides at the University of Texas.

== Early life ==
Rob Roy Kelly was born in Lincoln, Nebraska, on March 15, 1925. Kelly grew up living in small towns in northeast Texas and east-central Nebraska. In high school, he played basketball, football, and was active in the arts. He served as a U.S. Marine for three years (1943–1946) during WWII, two of which were spent in the Central Pacific.

== Education ==
Under the G.I. Bill Kelly started at the University of Nebraska to study Advertising and Geology in 1946. In 1948 he transferred to the Minneapolis School of the Arts (later Minneapolis College of Art and Design) to study visual arts. He was called back into service from 1950 to 1951 during the Korean War, serving as the screen-printing shop manager at Camp Pendleton. After he completed his service he returned to finish his studies at Minneapolis School of the Arts, graduating with a BFA in 1952. After graduation, he taught at the school as a screen-printing instructor until 1953 when he started his studies in Graphic Design at Yale University under Alvin Eisenman, Josef Albers, Alvin Lustig, Herbert Matter, Lester Beall, and Gabor Peterdi.

== Career ==
=== Teaching ===
After earning an MFA in Graphic Design from Yale University in 1955, Kelly returned to Minneapolis to teach and was asked by the school's director to establish an undergraduate printmaking program and lead the second-year foundations program. Based on his success developing those programs, he was then asked to establish an undergraduate program in Graphic Design — the first of its kind in the United States — in 1957. He acted as the department's first chair until he departed to start the country’s second undergraduate program in Graphic Design at KCAI in 1964.

At KCAI Kelly, rather than building a department from scratch, was tasked with transforming the existing commercial arts program with its heavy emphasis on illustration. His work developing the department's curriculum included previous experiences at Yale and in Minneapolis. Gordon Salchow, a recent alumnus from Yale (and a former student of Kelly's in Minneapolis) was one of his first faculty hires. During this time Kelly became aware of the work of Armin Hoffmann's students at the Kunstgewerbeschule Basel (later Schule für Gestaltung Basel). He started a correspondence with Hofmann inquiring about alumni to come teach in Kansas City. At the recommendation of Hoffman Kelly hired Inge Druckery in 1966 as the first Basel-trained graphic designer to teach full-time in the US. Kelly subsequently hired Hans Allemann and Chris Zelinsky the following year in 1967.

He left KCAI when the graphic design and industrial design departments were combined into one program in 1974. From 1974–1975 Kelly taught at Rochester Institute of Technology as the Kern Institute Professor of Communications. After a hiatus from teaching Kelly served as an Andrew Mellon Fellow at Carnegie Mellon University, 1977–1978, and was then hired as a full-time professor at CMU where he taught until 1983. Kelly was hired by Arizona State University to start and chair a graphic design program in 1983. This would be the third graphic design department Kelly built. He was faculty and chair of the department until his official retirement in 1989. From 1990–1992 Kelly acted as a program consultant, and full-time faculty member at Western Michigan University. He returned to Tempe and taught full-time in the program at Arizona State University from fall 1998 until spring 2000, concluding a teaching career that spanned over forty-five years.

== Death ==
Kelly died on January 23, 2004, of chronic obstructive pulmonary disease.

== Books ==
- American wood types 1828–1900, Volume one (1964)
- American wood type, 1828–1900: Notes on the evolution of decorated and large types and comments on related trades of the period (1969)
- A New Series of Old Wood Type Faces Available at Weimer, Complete from A to Z (1970) as editor
- Wood type alphabets, 100 fonts (1977) as editor
- American wood type, 1828–1900: Notes on the evolution of decorated and large types and comments on related trades of the period (1977) 1st paperback
- Trivets & Stands (1990)
- American wood type, 1828–1900: Notes on the evolution of decorated and large types and comments on related trades of the period (2010) reissued paperback
- “Search and Research.” In Specimen book of wood type: from the collection of the Silver Buckle Press (1999)
- Everything is a work in progress: the collective writings of Rob Roy Kelly on graphic design education (2001)

== Articles ==
- "American Wood Type." Design Quarterly (1963)
- "American Wood Type." Type Talks (1963)
- "Wood Letters in the 20th Century." Matrix (1965)
- "Collecting Wood Type." Publishers' Weekly (1969)
- "American Wood Types." Innovations in Paper (1970)
- "Art in the American University: Fact or Facade?" Art Journal (1972)
- "Design Education in State Universities: Why isn't it Better?" Print (1985)
- "Commentary on American Wood Type." Adobe Wood Type 1 (1990)
- Review of DeLittle 1888–1988: The First Years in a Century of Wood Letter Manufacture, 1888–1895, by Claire Bolton. Fine Print (1990)
- "Recollections of Josef Albers," Design Issues (Summer 2000)
- "Early Years of Graphic Design at Yale University" Design Issues (Summer 2001)
