= Hamilton Wood Type and Printing Museum =

Museum in Wisconsin, United States

Coordinates: 44°08′33.3″N 87°34′25.9″W

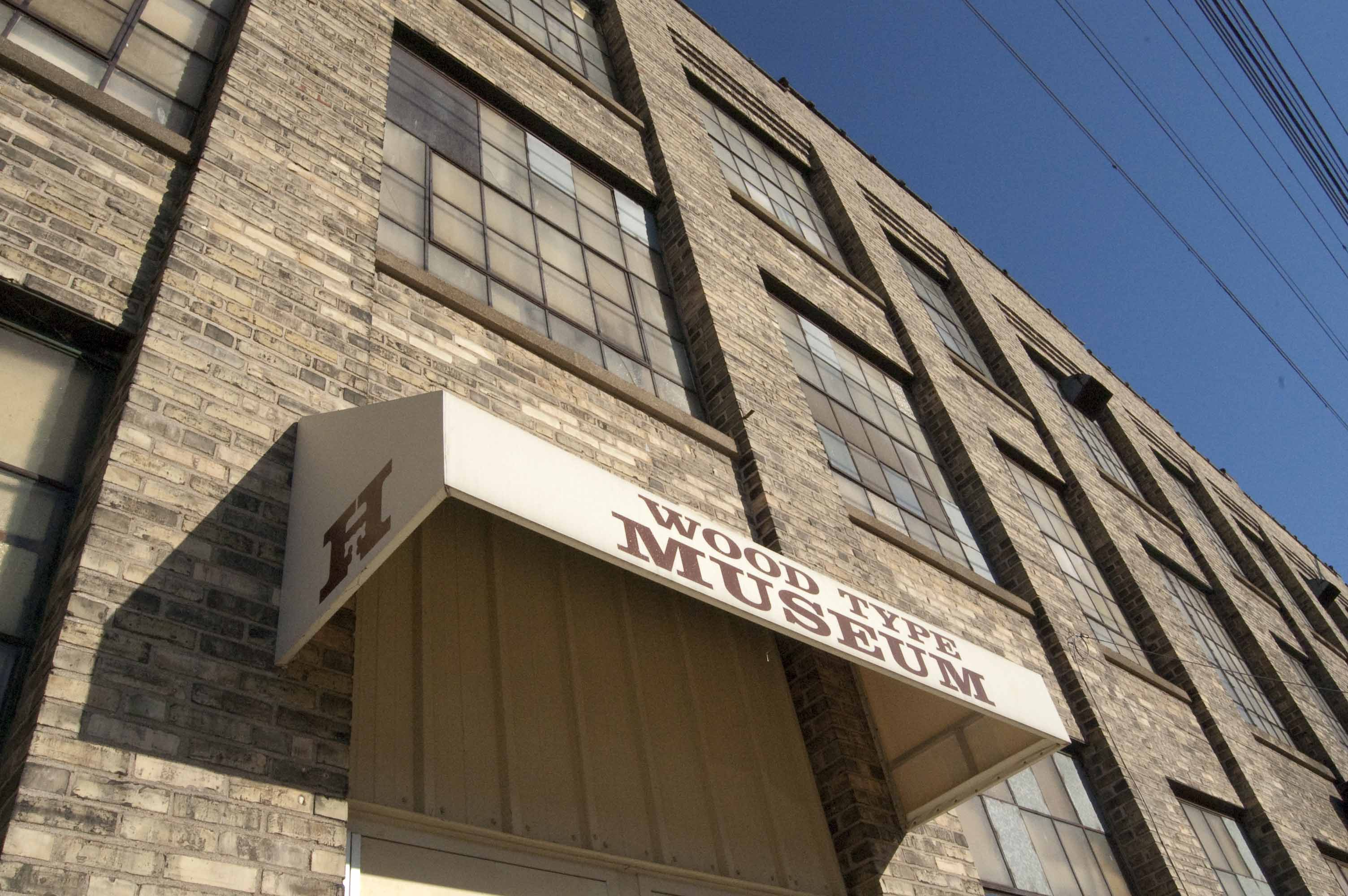
- Front entrance of the Hamilton Wood Type & Printing Museum
- Established: 1999
- Location: Two Rivers, WI
- Type: Historical and Art
- Visitors: 5,000 per year
- Founder: Two Rivers Historical Society
- Director: Peter Crabb
- Public transit access: Maritime Metro Transit
- Website: www.woodtype.org

The Hamilton Wood Type and Printing Museum was founded in 1999 and is located in Two Rivers, Wisconsin, United States. The museum is run by the Two Rivers Historical Society. It is dedicated to the preservation, study, production and printing of wood type used in letterpress printing. The museum is located in a factory building of the Hamilton Manufacturing Company founded in 1880 by J.E. Hamilton. The museum has a collection of over 1.5 million pieces in more than 1,000 styles of wood type. Also included are presses and vintage prints. The museum holds many workshops and conferences throughout the year and regularly welcomes groups of students from universities from across the United States.

== Hamilton Manufacturing Co. ==
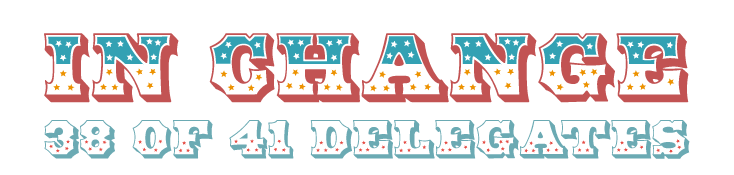
The American Chromatic digital font, released by the Hamilton Wood Type museum based on its collection of antique fonts. (Specimen image created by FontShop.)

The Hamilton Manufacturing Company was started by James Edward Hamilton and began producing type in 1880. Lyman Nash, editor of the Two Rivers Chronicle, asked Hamilton to make letters because he was short on time to order them from Chicago. Hamilton's letters printed so well that he began to take orders from other nearby newspapers.

Hamilton is now known as Hamilton Scientific, after the sale by previous company owner Thermo Fisher Scientific to OpenGate Capital, LLC on October 24, 2012.

== Move from Hamilton Factory ==
In the Fall of 2012 the museum was informed by the property owners that it would need to move from its location inside of the Hamilton Manufacturing Corporation and have the space vacated by early 2013. The museum, lacking funds and manpower, immediately began a campaign for donations and volunteers to help move the museum and the museum's collection.

The new location of the museum is in a building formerly owned by the Formrite Company in Two Rivers. The new building provides twice as much space as the original location.

After almost one year of being closed, the museum opened the doors at its new location on November 13, 2013.

The original historic/manufacturing building was demolished in 2015.

== Target's Vintage Varsity Collection ==
U.S. retailer Target Corporation used pieces from the museum's collection for their 2011 Fall fashion line. The collection was called "Vintage Varsity" and used the tag line "Cool Never Fades". The museum itself was one of three locations used for photo shoots for the line's print advertising campaign.

== Typeface documentary ==
The museum was the subject of the 2009 documentary film Typeface.

== See also ==
- Amateur press association
- Chandler & Price
- Letterpress printing
- Vandercook
