= The Chronicle (Two Rivers) =

The Chronicle, also known as the Two Rivers Chronicle, was a weekly newspaper published in Two Rivers, Manitowoc County, Wisconsin, from 1872 to 1927. From 1872 to 1899 it was called the Manitowoc County Chronicle, changing its name in 1899 to simply The Chronicle. In 1927 it merged with the rival Two Rivers Reporter to form the Reporter-Chronicle, which itself was purchased in 1970 by the Manitowoc Herald-Times to become The Herald Times Reporter.
