= Reverse-contrast typefaces =

Kind of typeface or custom lettering

Reverse-contrast "Italian" type in an 1828 specimen book by the George Bruce company of New York. Shown below it is a "fat face" design, a type also popular in early 19th century printing. Both typefaces are very bold, but the fat face's thick lines are the verticals as normal and the Italian's are the horizontals. (Note: The fat face design is Elephant by Matthew Carter, a modern revival of the genre.)

A reverse-contrast or reverse-stress letterform is a typeface or custom lettering where the stress is reversed from the norm, meaning that the horizontal lines are the thickest. This is the reverse of the vertical lines being the same width or thicker than horizontals, which is normal in Latin-alphabet writing and especially printing. The result is a dramatic effect, in which the letters seem to have been printed the wrong way round. The style was invented in the early nineteenth century as an attention-grabbing novelty for display typefaces. Modern font designer Peter Biľak, who has created a design in the genre, has described them as "a dirty trick to create freakish letterforms that stood out."

Reverse-contrast letters are rarely used for body text, being more used in display applications such as headings and posters, in which the unusual structure may be particularly eye-catching. They were particularly common in the nineteenth century, and have been revived occasionally since then. They could be considered as slab serif designs because of the thickened serifs, and are often characterised as part of that genre.

The reverse-contrast effect has been extended to other kinds of typeface, such as sans-serifs. There is no connection to reverse-contrast printing, where light text is printed on a black background.

== Historical background ==
Diagonal angle of stress in the typeface Centaur, based on 1470s Venetian printing. The narrowest part of the stroke is at top left/bottom right, so the axis is diagonal.

Throughout the development of the modern Latin alphabet with an upper-case based on Roman square capitals and lower-case based on handwriting, it has been the norm for the vertical lines to generally be slightly thicker than the horizontals. Early 'roman' or 'antiqua' type followed this model, often placing the thinnest point of letters at an angle and downstrokes heavier than upstrokes, mimicking the writing of a right-handed writer holding a quill pen. (The Hebrew alphabet, in contrast, is normally "reverse-contrast" from a Latin-alphabet perspective, as the verticals are lighter.)

From the arrival of roman type around 1475 to the late eighteenth century, relatively little development in letter design took place, as most fonts of the period were intended for body text, and they stayed relatively similar in design and rooted in traditions of Italian humanistic handwriting. (Note: This was not the only way in which fonts could appear different, however: differences in x-height, spacing, condensation and colour on the page can make body text fonts look different in design even if individual letters are not that different.)

A Didone type, Bodoni, from the late eighteenth century. The contrast has been increased and the axis of the contrast made more purely vertical.

A conventional slab-serif typeface, Rockwell. (Note: Rockwell is actually from the 1930s.) The serifs have been thickened and the contrast is minimal.

Starting in the seventeenth century, typefounders developed what are now called transitional and then "modern" or Didone types. These typefaces had a far greater amount of stroke contrast than before, with the difference in stroke width much greater than in earlier types. (Note: Didone types were at the time called 'modern' for their sophisticated image; the name has fallen from use as they have become less common in body text from around the end of the nineteenth century.) These had more constructed letterforms, catching up to the steely calligraphy of the period, and daringly slender horizontals and serif details that could show off the increasingly high quality of paper and printing technology of the period. In addition, these typefaces had a strictly vertical stress: without exception, the vertical lines were thicker than the horizontals, creating a much more geometric and modular design.

A second major development of the period was the arrival of the printed poster and increasing use of signpainting and printing for publicity and advertising. This caused a desire to develop eye-catching new types of letters. As a result, new styles of lettering and "display type" began to appear, such as "fat face" bold faces, sans serif letters, apparently inspired by classical antiquity, and then slab-serifs. These letterforms were a new departure and not simply larger versions of traditional serif letters. Presumably to be more eye-catching, these new styles of letter were often extremely bold.

== The first reverse-contrast types ==
The earliest known reverse contrast typeface dates to about 1821. It was created by the Caslon Type Foundry in London (then called Caslon and Catherwood), presumably as a parody of the crisp, high-contrast "Didone" typefaces and lettering of the period. A caps-only design, the foundry's steel master punches survive in the collection of the St Bride Library, London. (Note: Barnes and Schwartz show images of surviving punches for the Five Lines Pica size from the 1830s, which was not the first size to be released.)

The Caslon Italian typeface is very clearly "conceptual" in design, deliberately taking aspects of the fat face and one by one inverting them; Nick Sherman comments that it "shows a very literal approach to reversing stroke weight, so thicks become thin and thins become thick." It has very thick serifs, so the gap between the serifs and the main strokes making up the letters is very small, as can be seen on letters such as "E" and "S". To make the effect even more shocking, the triangular serifs were inverted (becoming thinner as they met the letter, not thicker), and the thicker line on the "A" was moved from its normal position on the right (the natural position matching the handwriting of a right-handed writer) to the left, making a letter that seems to have been drawn the wrong way round. Writing for Print magazine, Paul Shaw described it as "one of the most bizarre slab serif types of the 19th century." (Note: Slab-serif letterforms were new at the time. The earliest dated example is woodblock lettering on an 1810 advertisement from London, then a series of fonts from Vincent Figgins of c. 1817.) Paul Barnes and Christian Schwartz describe it as "perverse [but] done with sureness and confidence."

The Caslon company called the type "Italian". Several display types at the time received exotic names: around the same time, "Egyptian" was applied to sans- (and then slab-) serif types and "Antique" to slab-serifs; this became increasingly common later in the century as more fanciful display faces were made. Shields writes that "I have found no evidence of examples earlier than Caslon & Catherwood's". Nicolete Gray was prepared to believe that it was "probably" Italian in origin, however she was influenced by the French writer on printing Francis Thibaudeau, who claimed in his 1921 book La Lettre d'Imprimerie that the style appeared in France during the First French Empire (1804–1814/15), before its first known appearance in Britain. Shields (2008) rejects Thibaudeau's claim: "Thibaudeau seems alone...and does not credit any French foundry with the origination of the type. In my investigations so far I have found no evidence of examples earlier than Caslon & Catherwood's. ... The first French specimen with a confirmed date is Laurent & Deberny's 1835 broadside". Barnes also comments "I've never seen French or Italian sources", but has left the design's origin as an open question. Reverse-contrast designs do slightly resemble capitalis rustica writing from Ancient Rome, which also has emphatic horizontal serifs at top and bottom, although this may be a coincidence. Other names such as Egyptian were also used.

Within a few years of their introduction the eminent printer Thomas Curson Hansard had lamented them as "typographic monstrosities":

Fashion and Fancy commonly frolic from one extreme to another. To the razor-edged fine lines and serifs of [Didone] type ... a reverse [of slab serifs] has succeeded ... the property of which is, that the strokes which form the letters are all of one uniform thickness! After this, who would have thought that further extravagance could have been conceived? It remains, however, to be stated, that the ingenuity of one founder has contrived a type in which the natural shape is reversed, by turning all the serifs and fine strokes into fats, and the fats into leans. Oh! sacred shades of [eminent typefounders of the past] Moxon and van Dijck, of Baskerville and Bodoni! What would ye have said of the typographic monstrosities here exhibited, which Fashion in our age has produced? And those who follow, as many years hence as you have preceded us, to what age or beings will they ascribe the marks here exhibited as a specimen?

In contrast, Walter Tracy described the design in 1986 as "a jeu d'esprit, not meant to be judged in conventional aesthetic terms."

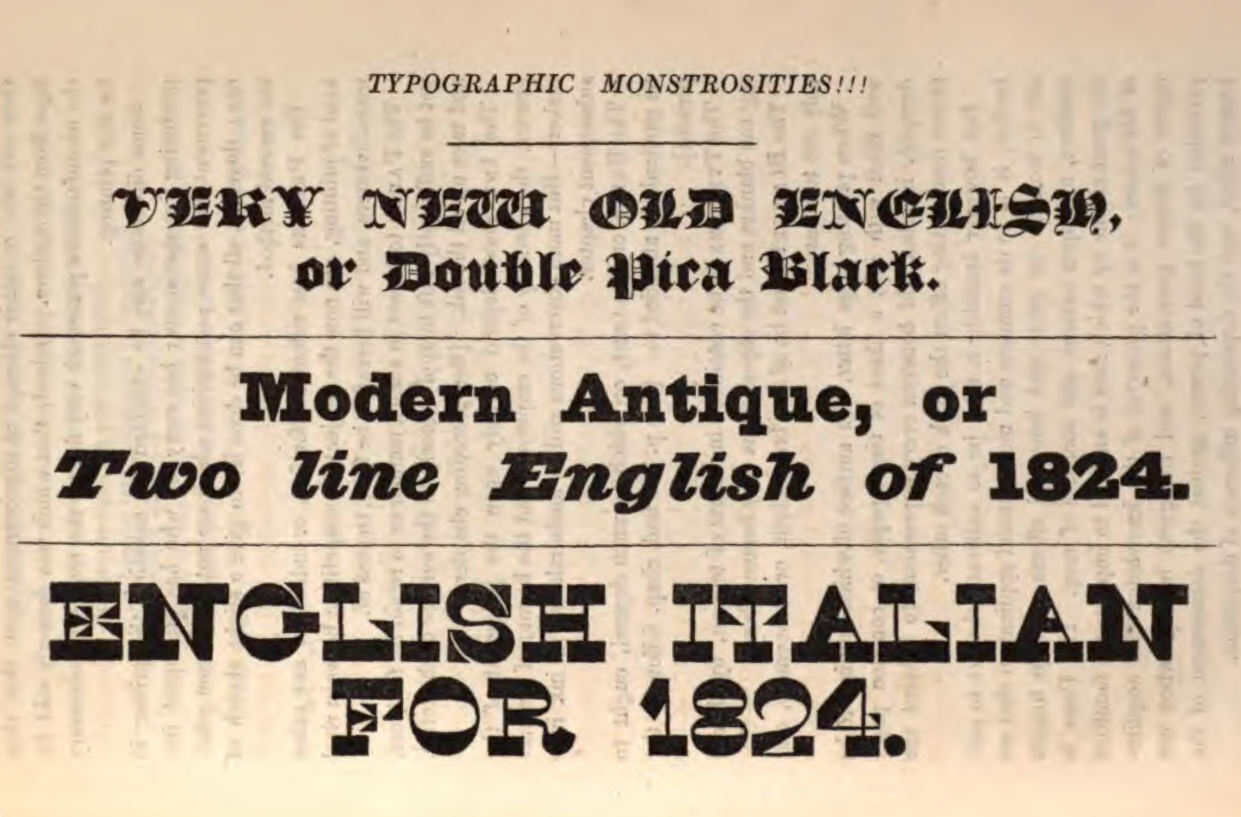
Hansard's 1825 gallery of ultra-bold "monstrosities!!!" The typefaces are blackletter, slab serif and the "Italian" type at the bottom. ("English" in the bottom two samples refers to the font size.)

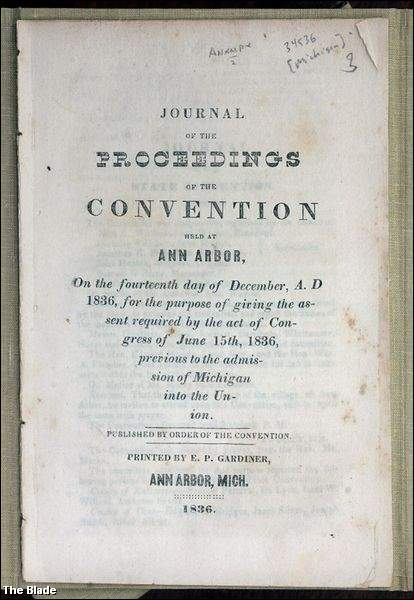
A document printed in 1836, showing Didone (body text), "Italian" (the word "proceedings") and early sans-serif fonts. The "Italian" type is Caslon's Italian or a close copy. The document was printed in Michigan, showing how far the Italian style had penetrated around 15 years after its appearance in London.

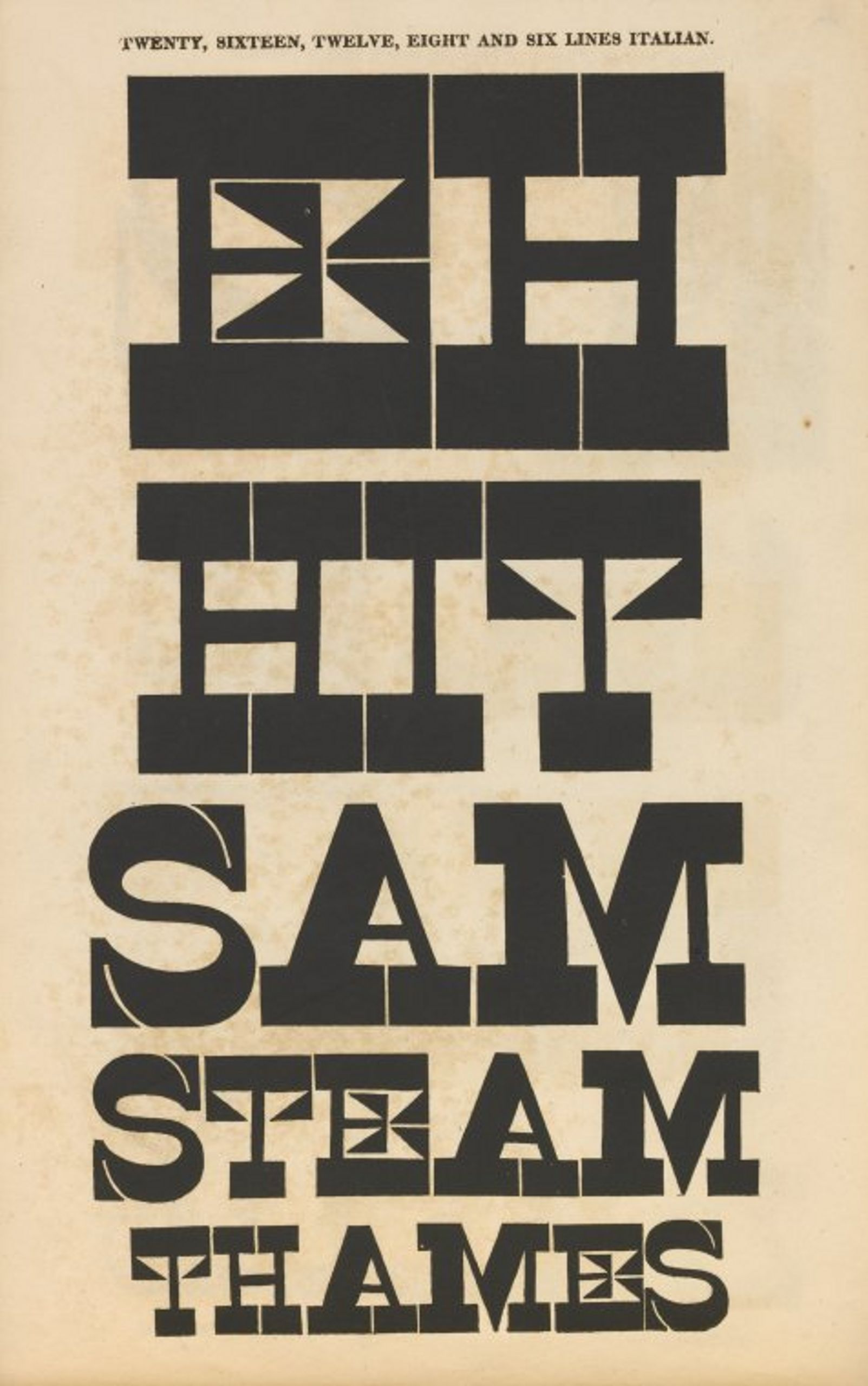
Reverse-contrast executed in wood type by William Leavenworth, c. 1830s

The design was apparently successful, since it rapidly spread to the United States and elsewhere. An Italian type first appeared in the United States in an 1826 specimen of Star, Little & Co , and the George Bruce foundry of New York displays one in its 1828 specimen book. Many versions of similar designs were released, both as metal and as wood type. (Note: Other digitised specimen books of the period showing Italians are Caslon 1841, Bruce 1869, Boston, 1880.) Expansions of the concept included italic faces, confusingly called "Italian Italic", backslanted and sans-serif versions.

Around the same time, wood type was becoming popular for poster printing. Previously metal was common for this since it could be easily cast in a repeated shape, but the introduction of the lateral router by Darius Wells in 1827 and the pantograph by William Leavenworth in 1834 allowed wood type to be mass produced. Wood type was much lighter than metal type and cheaper. Several Italian designs were released as wood type from 1837 onwards.

Several digitisations of the Italian style have been made. Peter Biľak's Karloff is a family of normal and matching reverse-contrast fonts with upper- and lower-case, together with a low-contrast slab serif design, all with the same basic structure. Biľak and his colleagues tried to strictly invert the contrast of a conventional Didone font and interpolate the two for the low-contrast slab serif. These have been released as Karloff Positive, Negative and Neutral, the name referring to Boris Karloff. A caps-only revival with extremely high contrast is Kris Sowersby's Maelstrom, which also has a sans-serif companion design. Paul Barnes of Commercial Type has released an Italian revival, along with extensive information on the research made for the project and a companion French Antique design (see below). Village Type's Arbor also a lower-case, while Match & Kerosene's Slab Sheriff is caps-only, with a "A" featuring the conventional stress on the right. Another digitisation was made by Justin Howes for private use.

== French Clarendon ==
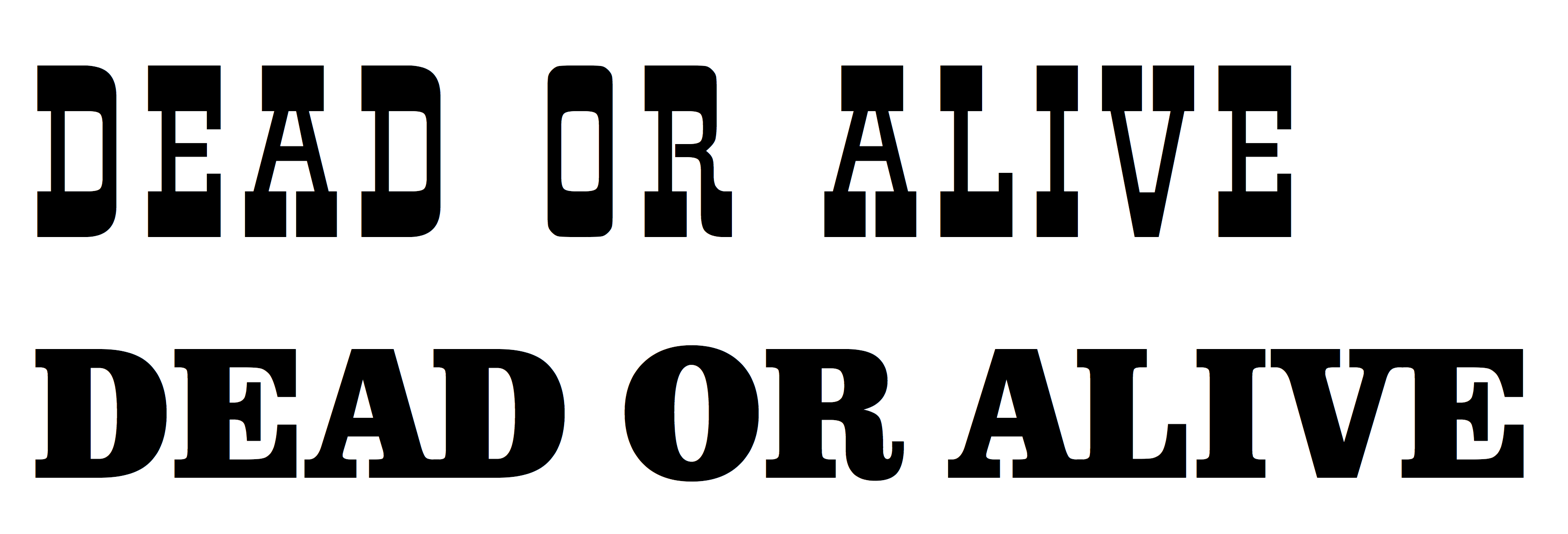
French Clarendon type (top) compared to a conventional Clarendon design.

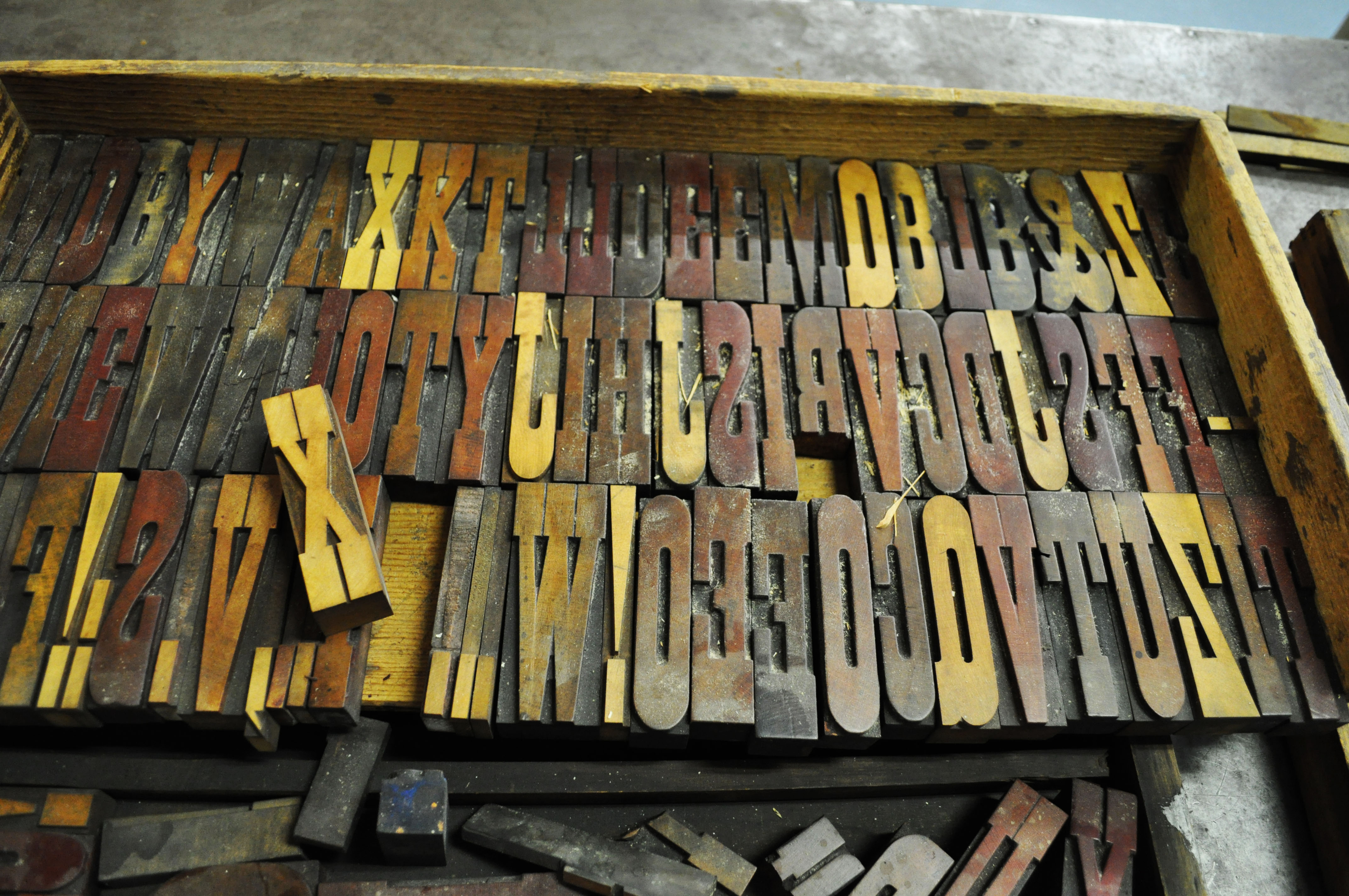
French Clarendon wood type, showing its highly condensed design.

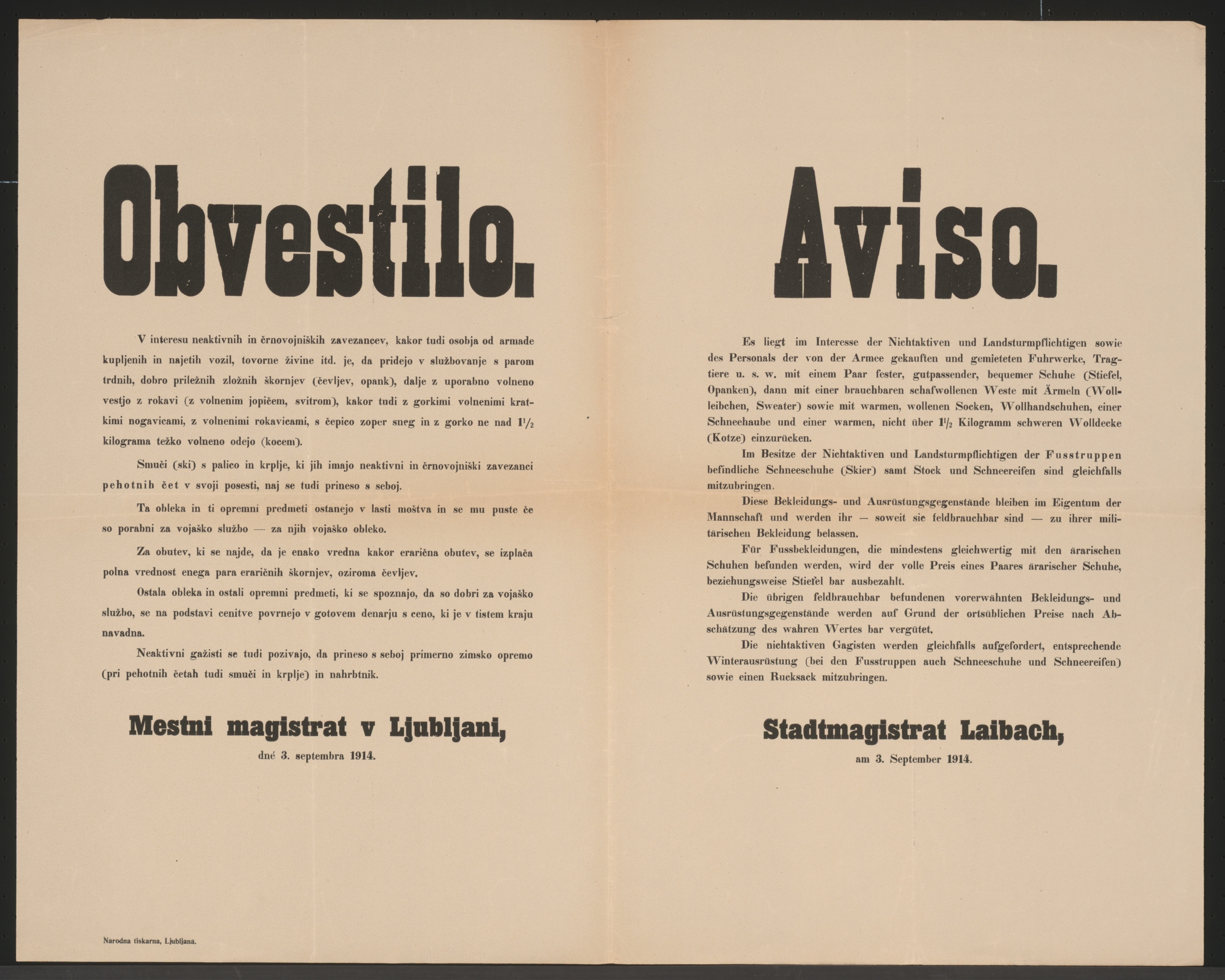
French Clarendon type on a 1914 poster from Ljubljana.

The reverse-contrast idea fused with a separate genre of slab-serif face, known as Clarendons. In the mid to late nineteenth century, it became popular for type foundries to offer reverse-contrast variants of Clarendon, a popular slab serif type genre, especially in the United States, creating large block serifs at the top and bottom of the letter. This was known as "French Clarendon" type. The advantage of French Clarendon type was that it allowed very large, eye-catching serifs while the letters remained narrow, suiting the desire of poster-makers for condensed but very bold type. French Clarendon designs were often created in wood type, used for large-print letters on posters. They are often associated with "wild-west" printing and seen on circus posters and wanted notices in western movies, although the style was really used in many parts of the world during this period. The style is sometimes called "circus letter". The practice was less popular with more artisanal printers: DeVinne commented in 1902 that "To be hated, it needs but to be seen." In Europe the style was sometimes called Italienne, matching the Caslon name. In contrast to the original Caslon type, which features horizontals in the middle of the letter (like the cross-bar in the H) that are often but not always thick, French Clarendon types have the only thick lines at the top and botton, and all inner horizontals thin, and are generally less "conceptually" reverse-contrast, with serifs in a more conventional alignment apart from the thick strokes at top and bottom.

Although Bodoni and Didot fuelled their designs with the calligraphic practices of their time, they created new forms that collided with typographic tradition and unleashed a strange new world, where the structural attributes of the letter-serif and stem, thick and thin strokes, vertical and horizontal stress-would be subject to bizarre experiments ... Fonts of astonishing height, width and depth appeared: expanded, contracted, shadowed, inlined, fattened, faceted and floriated. Serifs abandoned their role as finishing details to become independent architectural structures, and the vertical stress of traditional letters canted in new directions.

— Ellen Lupton

David Shields reports that the first type of the genre is the "French Antique" face of Robert Besley & Co. (which had released and copyrighted the first Clarendon face) in an 1854 specimen. The University of Texas at Austin, which maintains a large archive of American wood type, reports that the first known wood French Clarendon type was issued by William Hamilton Page in 1865. Their collection shows the many other names used for wood type which display reverse-contrast characteristics, including "Celtic", "Belgian", "Aldine" and "Teutonic", as well as Italian again and sometimes "Tuscan" or "Etruscan" also. (Note: The defining feature of 'Tuscan' fonts is that they have diamond points protruding from the letter and/or ornate serifs, but some were reverse-contrast also.) (At the time a separation did not fully exist between genre names and typeface names, so these may be the names of individual types, or if they proved popular the name of the subgenre they created.) At least one sans-serif typeface with reverse contrast was developed in this period.

A variety of more modern adaptations have been made of the style, including Robert Harling's Playbill (1938) and more recently Adrian Frutiger's Westside, URW++'s Zirkus and Bitstream's P. T. Barnum.

Writing on why he created a design in the genre, Frutiger, a designer better-known for his work in the sans-serif genre, commented:

As a type designer I wanted to draw something in every style. It's a matter of professional pride ... I found the existing Italiennes with their big feet too harsh and strict ... the fine curves in the serifs give Westside its own expression. A text set in this typeface looks like a weaving pattern ... I really enjoyed drawing it. For one thing it was great fun.

Frutiger decided to return to the Caslon type's pattern of all horizontals being thick apart from those on "a" and "e", which he felt could not be fitted into this system.

== Modern reverse-contrast types ==
Because of their quirky, hand-made design, lighter versions of the French Clarendon style were popular for uses such as film posters in the 1950s and '60s.

A well-reviewed modernisation of the style has been Trilby by David Jonathan Ross, who has written and lectured on the history of the genre. Released by Font Bureau, it is reminiscent of Clarendon revivals from the 1950s. It attempts to adapt the style to use in a much wider range of settings, going so far as to be usable for text. Bigfish is another modernisation inspired by lettering, in which the thickest stress is at the top. Some other adaptations have preserved the concept but changed genre, presenting sans-serif or script typefaces in the same style. Antique Olive of 1966 by Roger Excoffon is a well-known sans-serif design with subtle reverse-contrast aspects, particularly visible in its ultra-bold "Nord" style, while Signo is a sans-serif reverse-contrast design from 2015.

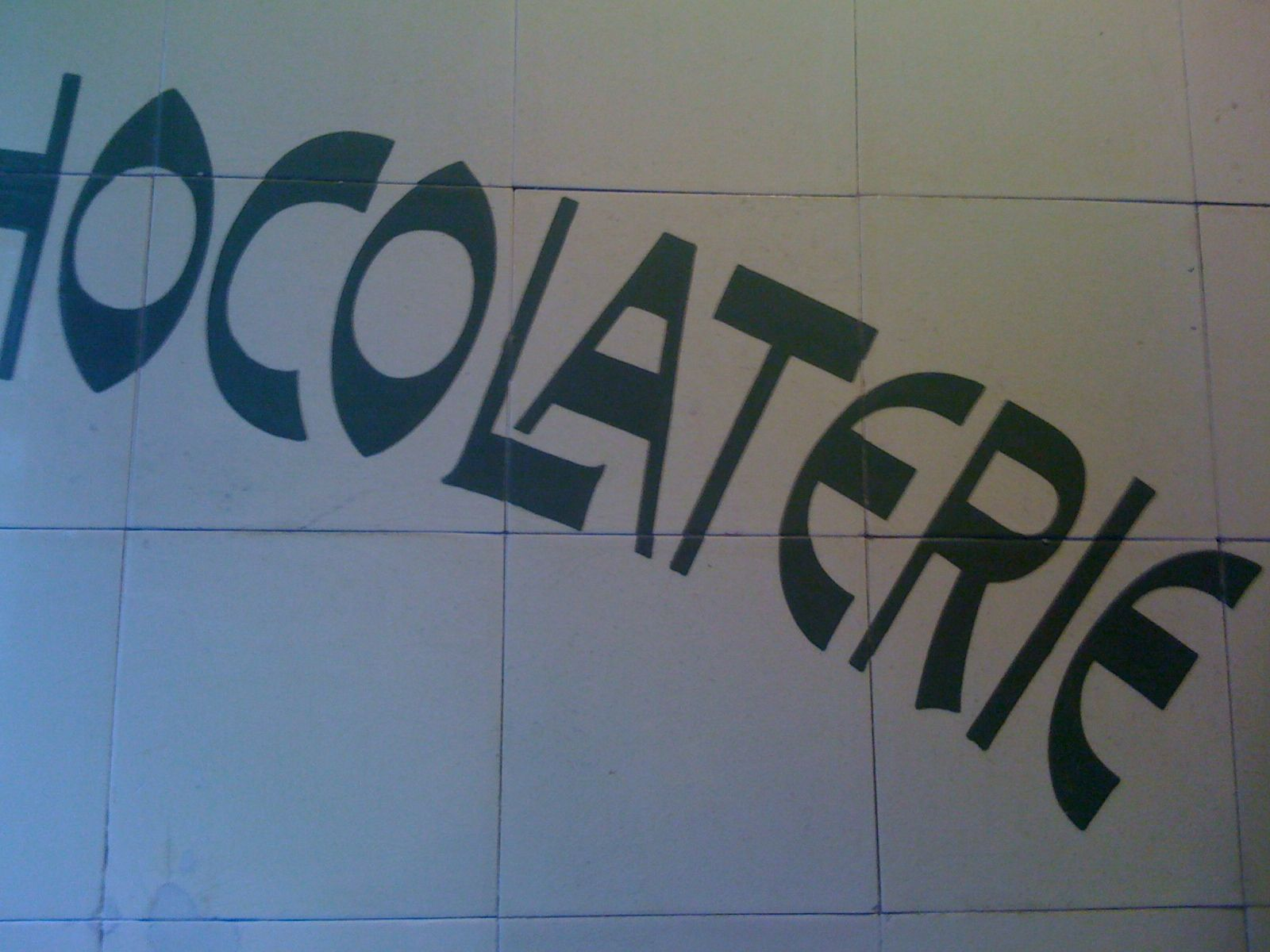
Reverse contrast lettering on tiles at a chocolaterie at The Hague, Netherlands. Date unknown.

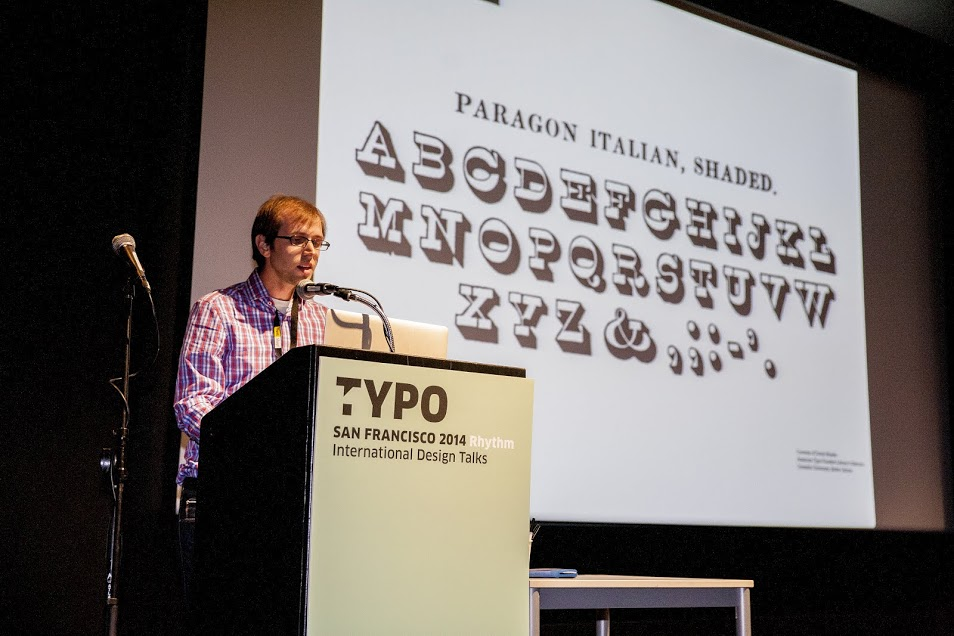
David Jonathan Ross speaking on the history of reverse-contrast letters

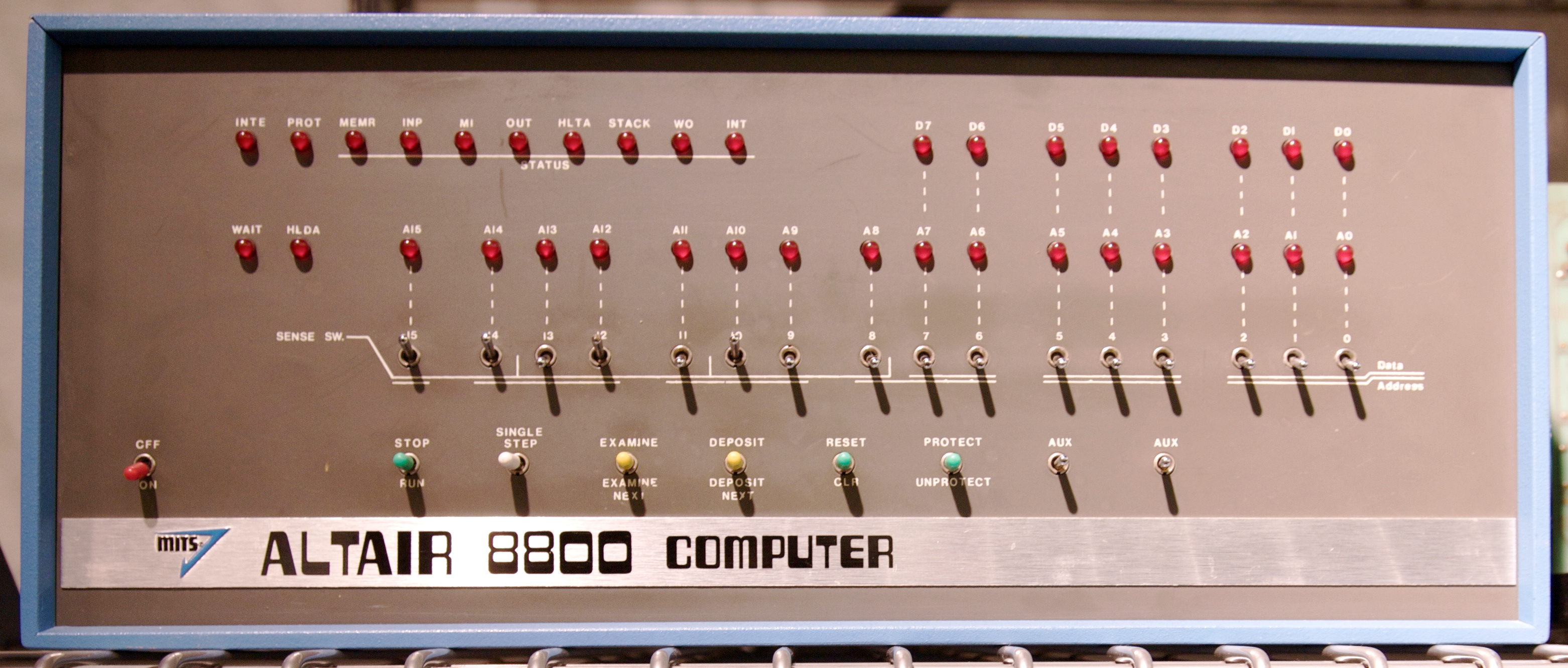
Various unusual stresses on the logo of the Altair 8800 computer, 1975.
