= Imperial yellow =

Imperial yellow may refer to:

- Yellow in Chinese culture, various hues of yellow used as a symbol of imperial majesty or favor
- Royal yellow (#FADA5E), a specific shade associated with Chinese imperial robes
- The ammonium salt of hexanitrodiphenylamine, formerly used as a yellow dye
- A hue of Peking glass reminiscent of the imperial banner of the late Qing Empire
