= Merriweather (typeface) =

Serif typeface

- Category: Slab serif
- Classification: Mechanistic
- Designer: Eben Sorkin
- Commissioned by: Google
- Foundry: Google; Sorkin Type Co.
- Date created: 16 December 2010
- Date released: 20 December 2010; 15 years ago
- License: SIL Open Font License
- Variations: Merriweather Sans; NV Halcyon
- Latest release version: v2.1
- Latest release date: 5 April 2020

Merriweather is a slab serif typeface designed by former ATypI board member Eben Sorkin for Google in 2010. Since 2011, it has been continually updated through his Massachusetts-based company Sorkin Type Co., with the most recent update being made in 2020. It is currently among the top 20 most frequently used typefaces on Google Fonts annually, with direct usage on over two million different websites.

The typeface is notable for having a significantly taller x-height than most of its contemporary serif counterparts, giving it extra accessibility through ease of readability even when rendered at small sizes. The characters are also condensed in width to allow for more efficient use of page space, being developed particularly for news design, with a serif style inspired by Renaissance-era Roman type to provide an added sense of warmth to Merriweather's professional appearance.

== Charateristics ==
Merriweather, similarly to certain sans serif typefaces such as Helvetica and Verdana, has a uniquely tall x-height that puts its lowercase letterforms at just under three-quarters as tall as their uppercase counterparts. This is especially noticeable in the case of its letterforms with ascenders attached, as its b, d, f, h, k, and l all stand at visibly taller heights than any of its uppercase letterforms, all of which are equal in their own height, while its i and j are just marginally taller. The sole exception to this trait is its t, which is slightly shorter than the uppercase letterforms, but still rises well above the baseline.

It has a condensed width to make it easier to fit within a compressed space, making it ideal for printed publications to conserve paper usage. The serifs are therefore rather conservative where they stick out from one side of the letterform, truncated to minimize space usage while not sacrificing readability.

== Usage ==
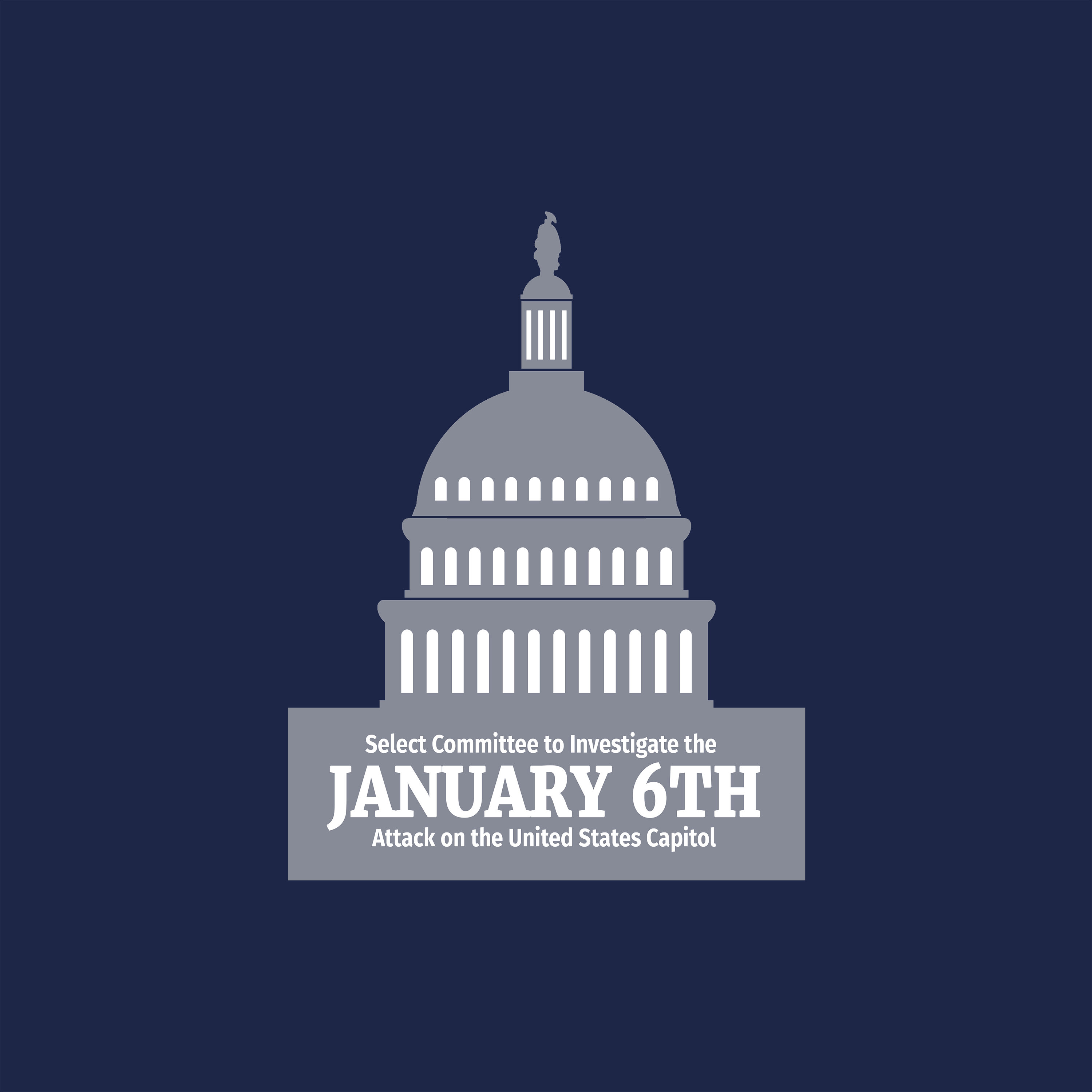
The official logo of the January 6th Committee, which uses a boldfaced variant of the Merriweather typeface.

The primary goal of Merriweather's development was to create an easily readable, space-efficient typeface meant for usage in professional, frequently-issued fields of written work such as periodical literature and academic publishing, as well as to demand less eye strain than other typefaces when viewed through digital formats such as websites. As such, when used in print, its usage is most commonly via serially published documentational works such as regional newspapers and technical handbooks in both its regular serif form and in its sans serif variant, Merriweather Sans. It has also been used in publications by the Centers for Disease Control and Prevention and the World Health Organization, and is the primary typeface used in the popular incremental game Cookie Clicker.

In 2017, Donald Trump, the 45th President of the United States, would use Merriweather as the new typeface for the official White House website, whitehouse.gov, replacing previous president Barack Obama's choices of Hoefler Text and Whitney. Following the January 6 United States Capitol attack in 2021, the website would use Merriweather on the headers of the posts recapping the press release given by White House press secretary Kayleigh McEnany acknowledging the violent riot that occurred and the proclamation by Trump himself honoring the death of Brian Sicknick and the death of Howard Liebengood, neither of which acknowledged how the violence was incited. As a response, the January 6th Committee would design their logo and publish their investigative documents with the same typeface, with the digital director for committee chair Bennie Thompson declining to comment on its usage.

== Reception ==
Merriweather has received widespread acclaim from design enthusiasts and media outlets for its easily legible nature, both in print and digitally, and for its ability to blend well together with several other typefaces. Jason Pamental, principal designer for American online retailer Chewy, has referred to it as "extremely readable". It is frequently cited as a good choice of typeface for usage in things such as résumés and professional documents.
