= Stil de grain yellow =

Pigment traditionally derived from unripe buckthorn berries

Color coordinates
- Hex triplet: #FADA5E
- sRGB^{B} (r, g, b): (250, 218, 94)
- HSV (h, s, v): (48°, 62%, 98%)
- CIELCh_{uv} (L, C, h): (88, 81, 70°)
- Source: ISCC-NBS
- ISCC–NBS descriptor: Brilliant yellow
- B: Normalized to [0–255] (byte)

Stil de grain yellow, royal yellow or sap green is a pigment derived from berries of the buckthorn species Rhamnus saxatilis, which are commonly called Avignon berries or Persian berries after two historical areas of supply; latterly Italy was a major source. The color, whose principal chemical component is rhamnetin, was formerly called pink (or pinke); latterly, to distinguish it from light red "pink", the yellow "pink" was qualified as Dutch pink, brown pink, English pink, Italian pink, or French pink — the first three also applied to similar quercitron dyes from the American eastern black oak, Quercus velutina. Other names are Persian berries lake, yellow berries and buckthorn berries.

The first recorded use of royal yellow as a color name in English was in 1548. Other names for this color are Chinese yellow and imperial yellow.

== Manufacture ==
Traditional sap green is made from both ripe and unripe buckthorn berries, and prepared in different ways. Berry harvest time, varietal, preparation method and time period of use influence the common name used to refer to that particular hue, color, recipe or chemical composition. Extracting the coloring principle through boiling water allows one to add different mordants, such as alum or soda, each resulting in a different hue of this color.

Unripe berries (Italian: rhamni immaturi) produces a pigment that is dark brown in bulk and turns to bright yellow in a thin layer. It has a low lightfastness rating of about 4. Ripe berries (Italian: rhamni maturi) produce a color called yellow madder, stil de grain, or yellow lake. It is not permanent and was often used for decorative painting.

Most often when called sap green the color is in the form of a dyestuff, either direct from berry juice or as a lake precipitated with alum. In lake form, this color is considered to fade rapidly.

== History ==
For use in medieval illuminated manuscripts, the color was sold in dried sheep bladders in a liquid form that resembled a dense syrup, instead of being dried and sold as powder.

The first recorded use of pinke as a color name in English for this yellow pigment was in 1598. The names stil de grain yellow and yellow madder came into use as the name for this yellow pigment in the early to mid-18th century, replacing the former name pinke.

In the 17th century, the word pink or pinke was used to describe a yellowish pigment, which was mixed with blue colors to yield greenish colors. Thomas Jenner's A Book of Drawing, Limning, Washing (1652) categorizes "Pink & blew bice" amongst the greens (p. 38), and specifies several admixtures of greenish colors made with pink—e.g. "Grasse-green is made of Pink and Bice, it is shadowed with Indigo and Pink ... French-green of Pink and Indico [shadowed with] Indico" (pp. 38–40). In William Salmon's Polygraphice (1673), "Pink yellow" is mentioned amongst the chief yellow pigments (p. 96), and the reader is instructed to mix it with either saffron or ceruse for "sad" or "light" shades thereof, respectively (p. 98).

The pigment was used widely in the 18th century in France and England. This color is also a representation of the color of the robes worn by the Emperor of China.

== Modern use ==
Although it is used widely by name, it is rare to find a pre-made fine artist product that contains this pure pigment. Berries, ripe or unripe, and different versions of the lake are obtainable in powdered pigment form, although it is costly compared to its substitutes. It is fugitive and therefore not ideally suited for oil color, but has survived well in manuscript form due to the natural protections from light and moisture that a book offers.

In contemporary art supplies the term "sap green" often indicates a mixture intending to resemble the traditional sap green or stil de grain yellow. Contemporary oil colors often use coal tar lakes as a substitute. In 2006 Golden Artist Colors' line of "historical colors" acrylic paint included one named "sap green", made of synthetic iron oxide, nickel complex azo, brominated and chlorinated copper phthalocyanine and nearly pure amorphous carbon.

A modern authority for this as a color is the ISCC-NBS Dictionary of Color Names (1955)—Color Sample of Stil de Grain Yellow (color sample #83).

== See also ==
- List of colors
