= Joseph Moxon =

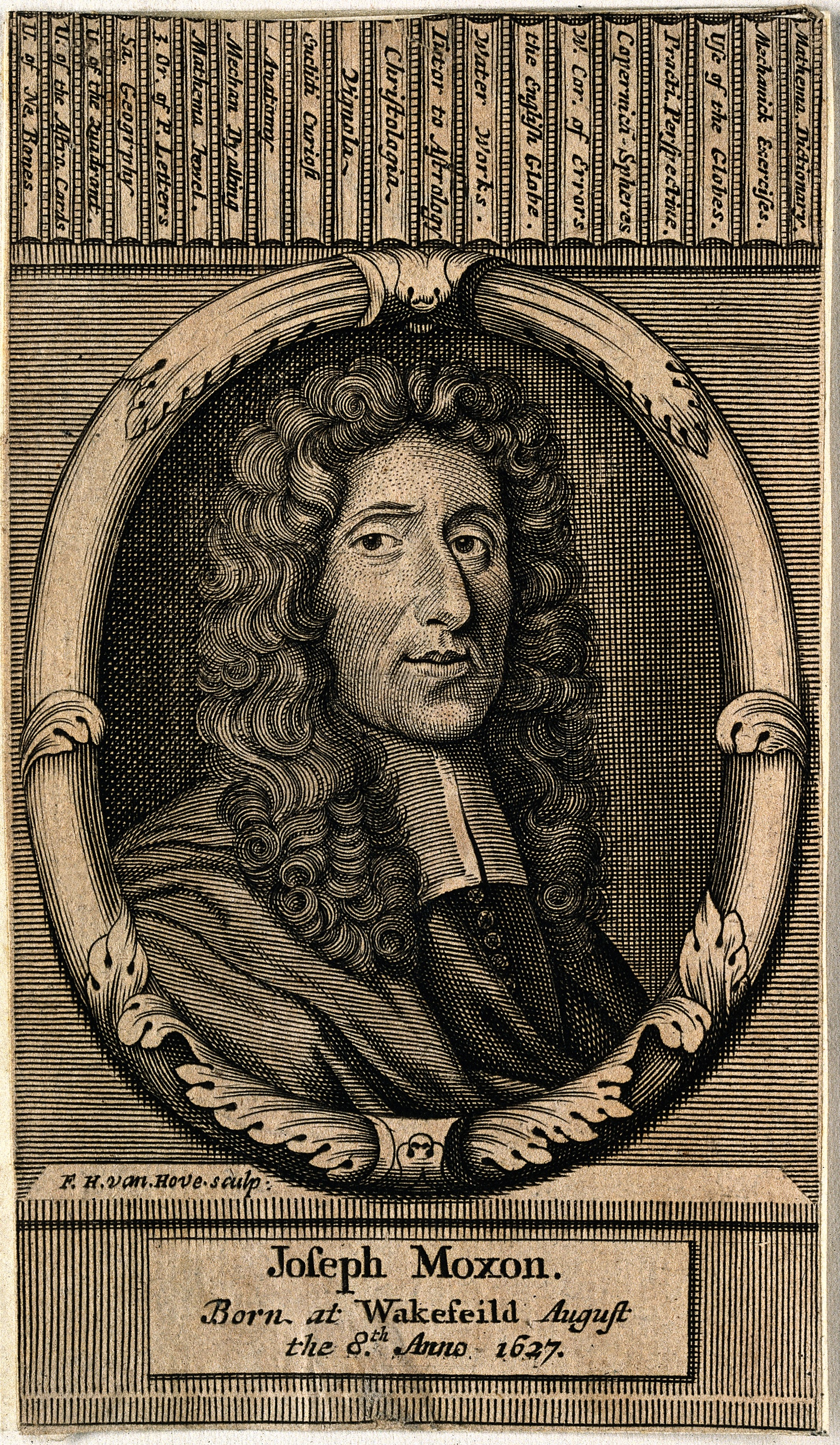
- Engraving of Joseph Moxon, 1692, by Frederick Hendrik van Hove.
- Born: 8 August 1627
- Died: February 1691 (aged 63)

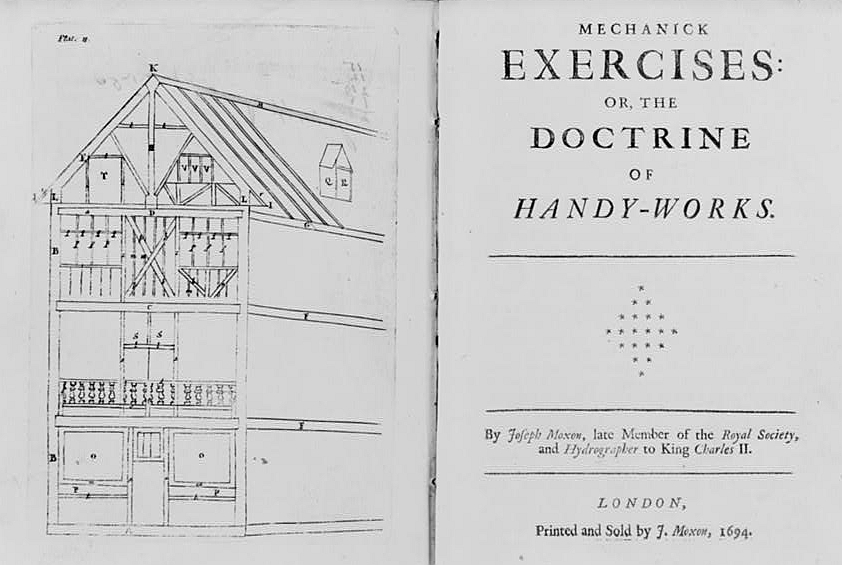
Frontispiece and title page of Joseph Moxon's Mechanick Exercises, 1694.

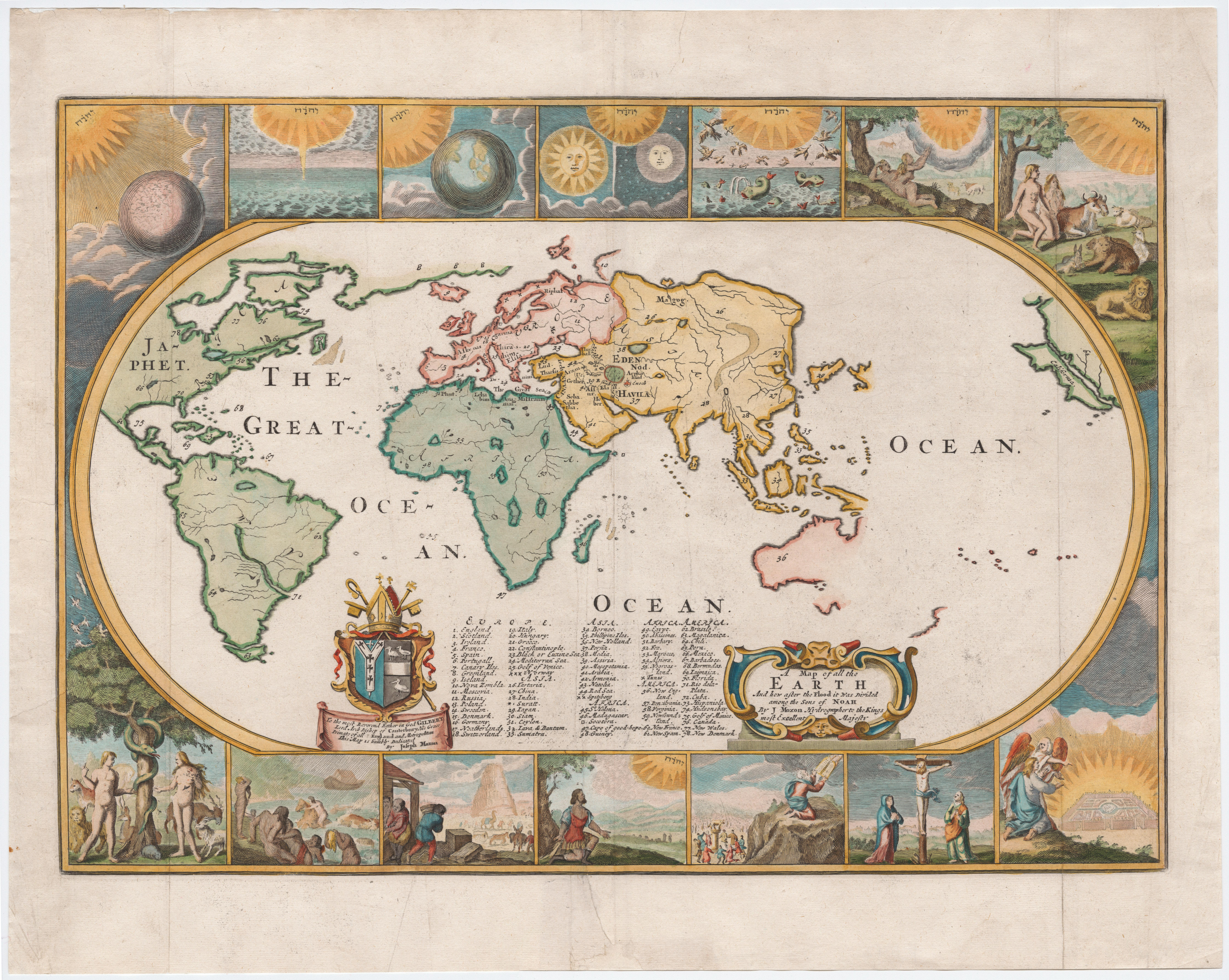
Moxon's Map with a view of the world as known in 1681. The seven days of creation are illustrated in the panels at the top of the map.

Joseph Moxon (8 August 1627 – February 1691), hydrographer to Charles II, was an English printer specialising in mathematical books and maps, a maker of globes and mathematical instruments, and mathematical lexicographer. He produced the first English-language dictionary devoted to mathematics, the first detailed instructional manual for printers, and the first English-language how-to books for tradesmen. In November 1678, he became the first tradesman to be elected as a Fellow of the Royal Society.

== Life ==
Joseph Moxon was born on 8 August 1627 in Wakefield, Yorkshire. Around 1638, at an age between 9 and 11, he accompanied his father, James Moxon, to Delft and Rotterdam where James was printing English Bibles. It was at this time that Moxon learned the basics of printing.

== Printer ==
After the First English Civil War the family returned to London and Moxon and his older brother, James, started a printing business which specialized in the publication of Puritan texts, with the notable exception of A Book of Drawing, Limning, Washing or Colouring of Mapps and Prints of 1647 which was produced for Thomas Jenner, a seller of maps.

In 1652, Moxon visited Amsterdam and commissioned the engraving of globe-printing plates, and by the end of the year was selling large celestial and terrestrial globes in a new business venture. He specialised in the printing of maps and charts, and in the production of globes, and mathematical instruments made of paper. Moxon is credited with popularising pocket globes and in England is considered the inventor of these miniature globes, having advertised a 3 inch globe for sale in 1659. Though Moxon may have drawn inspiration from a miniature globe produced by Blaeu ca 1618, pocket globes were more popular in England than in other countries producing them, namely The Netherlands and Germany. The international globe trade was dominated by Dutch publishers in the 16th and early 17th centuries and some attribute England's resurgence in the globe production market to Moxon's work from the mid 17th century.

Moxon's Mechanick exercises was published in parts between 1677 and 1684. It was completed in two volumes: the first giving instructions on metalworking, woodworking, brick-laying and sundial-construction; and the second (issued 1683–1684) providing a detailed series of instructions for printers, including typefounding, composition, press-work etc., which have given printing historians much (probably idealised) information on the working practices of hand-press period printing-houses.

== Hydrographer ==
In January 1662, he was appointed hydrographer to the King, despite his Puritan background. His shop at this time was on Ludgate Hill; afterwards, in 1683, it was "on the west side of Fleet Ditch", but always "at the sign of Atlas".

Moxon theorized that the Arctic was ice free, and warmed by twenty-four hours of sunlight in the summer. He also speculated that Arctic ice was created near land, and that if one sailed far enough northwards, one would be free of northern land masses and, subsequently, ice.

These views led him to believe that the Northwest Passage would be found by sailing near the North Pole. These views later influenced Daines Barrington and Samuel Engel, whose refinement of Moxon's ideas would influence Captain Cook's Third Voyage in search of the Northwest Passage.

== Death ==
When Moxon died in 1691 his estate and business was carried on by his son, mapmaker, engraver and instrument-maker James Moxon.

== Works ==
- A Tutor to Astronomy & Geography. Or, The Use of the Copernican Spheres. London (1665)
- Mechanick Exercises or the Doctrine of Handy-Works, 2 volumes. London (1677-1683).
- A collection of some attempts made to the North-East, and North-West, for the finding a passage to Japan, China, &c. London (1676)
- With Thomas Tuttell. Mathematicks made easie, or, A mathematical dictionary explaining the terms of art and difficult phrases used in arithmetick, geometry, astronomy, astrology, and other mathematical sciences. London (1700)
- Mechanick Exercises or the Doctrine of Handy-Works. London (1703 edition)
