= Thomas Jenner (publisher) =

English author, engraver and publisher

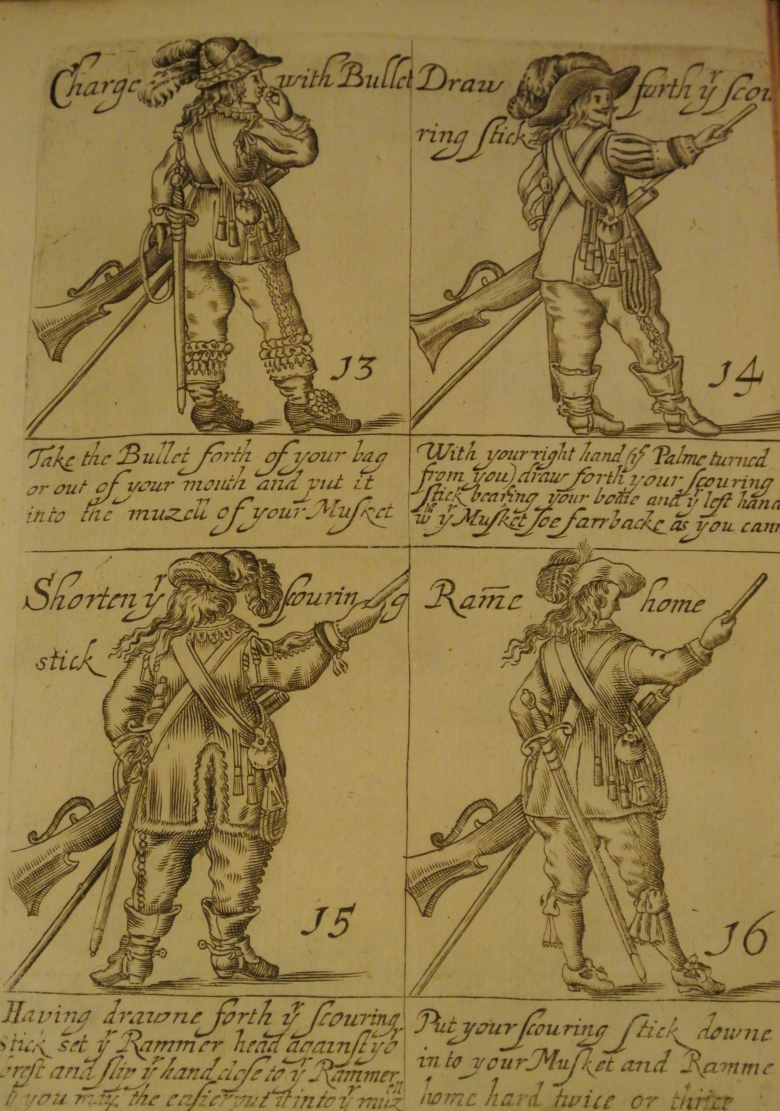
Illustration from The Military Discipline wherein is Martially Showne the Order for Drilling the Musket and Pike, published by Thomas Jenner, London 1642

Thomas Jenner (died 1673) was an English writer, engraver, and publisher in London. He kept from 1624 a print-shop by the south entrance of the Royal Exchange; it was recommended by John Evelyn to Samuel Pepys.

== In business ==
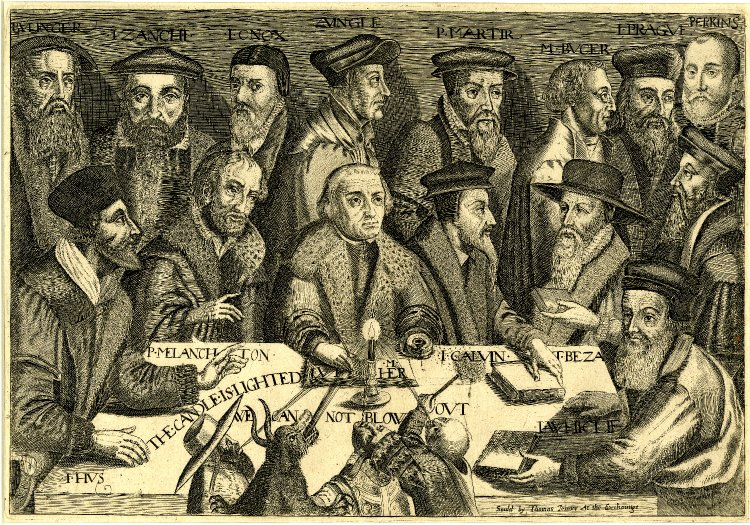
The candle is lighted, we cannot blow out, joint portrait of 15 Protestant reformers c. 1640, published by Thomas Jenner

With Michael Sparke, Jenner is regarded as a Puritan publisher, of works motivated by their moral, religious and Protestant patriotic content. An upmarket printseller with a broad base of stock, he was in competition with Peter Stent and Robert Walton. As well as portraits, some being of royalist interest, he sold broadsides and political material. Besides prints and books, he carried picture frames and stationery items.

Engravers who worked for Jenner included Francis Delaram, William Marshall and Willem de Passe, whose wife Elizabeth is thought likely to have been a relation of Jenner. Jan Barra made a set of engravings for the five senses.

Jenner's authors included Joseph Moxon and Matthew Stevenson.

== Works ==
=== Emblematic books ===
The first work attributed to Jenner himself is The Soules Solace; or Thirty and one Spirituall Emblems (edition 1626; 1631; 1639; 1651 under a new title, Divine Mysteries that cannot be seene, made plain by that which can be seene). It contains thirty copper-plate engravings (one repeated), each with descriptive letterpress. Some of those were influenced by Gabriel Rollenhagen. Other emblematists thought to have influenced Jenner were Dutch, Jacob Cats and Florentius Schoonhoven.

The final engraving, of a person in gay attire, with hat and plume, sitting and smoking at a table, is accompanied by a poem, once strangely attributed to George Wither, whose portrait the engraving was taken to be. The poem was in fact an allegorical work on earthly existence, and its burden was "Thus thinke, then drinke Tobacco." Wither, an opponent of smoking, wrote a reply with the counter-refrain, "Thus thinke, drinke no Tobacco."

The themes of other engravings were based on sermons preached in London, and exhibit anti-Catholic feeling. There is possibly allusion to the Fatal Vespers. The preachers of the sermons are indicated by two initials only. It has been argued that in particular the 27th engraving, "The new creation", with imagery based on an untuned musical instrument, could have been taken from preaching of John Donne.

Jenner produced two more works in the same general vein. The Ages of Sin, or Sinne's Birth and Growth. With the Stepps and Degrees of Sin from thought to finall Impenitencie consists of a series of engraved plates in which, as in Francis Quarles's Emblems, each is accompanied by six metrical lines. There is also The Path of Life and the Way that leadeth down to the Chambers of Death or the Steps to Hell and the Steps to Heaven, in which all men may see their ways set forth in copper prints. London, 1656. It is debated whether this last work should be classified as an emblem book. Freeman disqualifies this book by Jenner as an emblem book, by a general four-point criterion. Manning elucidates Jenner's intention by means of a biblical motto, Romans 1:20, associated with the emblematist Filippo Picinelli by his translator Augustin Erath, and paraphrased on the title page of Jenner's book as "by the outward and visible we may the easier see that which is inward and invisible".

=== Maps ===
Attributed to Jenner is the Direction for the English Traveller, with maps by Jacob van Langeren, 1643. It was based on a 1635 book of similar title by Matthew Simmons, with enlarged maps. The "Quartermaster's Map" used by both sides in the English Civil War was by Wenceslas Hollar and published by Jenner. It was closely based on the maps of Christopher Saxton.

=== Other works ===
In 1648 Jenner published a series of tracts entitled A further Narrative of the Passages of these Times, containing an engraving of the populace pulling down Cheapside Cross, together with portraits of Oliver Cromwell, Francis Manners, 6th Earl of Rutland, and Sir William Wadd, Constable of the Tower, signed "Thomas Jenner fecit". In 1650 he issued A Work for none but Angels and Men, that is to be able to look into and know ourselves. Or a Booke showing what the Soule is. According to Thomas Corser it is a prose translation of Sir John Davies's poem on the immortality of the soul, Nosce Teipsum of 1599. Either that year, or in 1651, Jenner issued London's Blame if not its Shame. Other works are:

- Wonderful and Strange Punishments inflicted on the Breakers of the Ten Commandments, London, 1650.
- Reportedly, a plate of a large ship, called The Soverayne of the Seas, 1653.

== Notes ==
Attribution

This article incorporates text from a publication now in the public domain: Lee, Sidney, ed. (1892). "Jenner, Thomas (fl.1631-1656)". Dictionary of National Biography. Vol. 29. London: Smith, Elder & Co.
