= James Moxon =

English map engraver and publisher, active 1671–1704; died 1708

James Moxon was an English printer, publisher and bookseller who was active in London during the seventeenth century.
