= Roman type =

Style of typeface

Bembo is a roman typeface (shown with italic) dating to 1928 based on punches cut by Francesco Griffo in 1494.

In Latin script typography, roman is one of the three main kinds of historical type, alongside blackletter and italic. Sometimes called normal or regular, it is distinct from these two for its upright style (relative to the calligraphy-inspired italic) and its simplicity (relative to blackletter).

During the early Renaissance, roman (in the form of Antiqua) and italic type were used separately. Today, roman and italic type are mixed, and most typefaces are composed of both an upright roman style and an associated italic or oblique style.

== History ==
Roman type was modelled from a European scribal manuscript style of the 15th century, based on the pairing of inscriptional capitals used in ancient Rome with Carolingian minuscules.

Early roman typefaces show a variety of designs, for instance resembling what would now be considered blackletter. Printers and typefounders such as Nicolas Jenson and Aldus Manutius in Venice and later Robert Estienne in France codified the modern characteristics of Roman type, for instance an 'h' with a nearly straight right leg, serifs on the outside of the capital 'M' and 'N', and 'e' with a level cross stroke, by the 1530s.

== Use today ==
Popular roman typefaces include Bembo, Baskerville, Caslon, Jenson, Times New Roman and Garamond. Its influence can also be seen in typefaces of other varieties, such as the slab serif typeface Merriweather.

The name roman is customarily applied uncapitalized distinguishing early Italian typefaces of the Renaissance period.

Roman is used as the default font in LaTeX.

== See also ==
- Gaelic type
- History of Western typography
- Serif
