= The Candle is Lighted, We Cannot Blow Out =

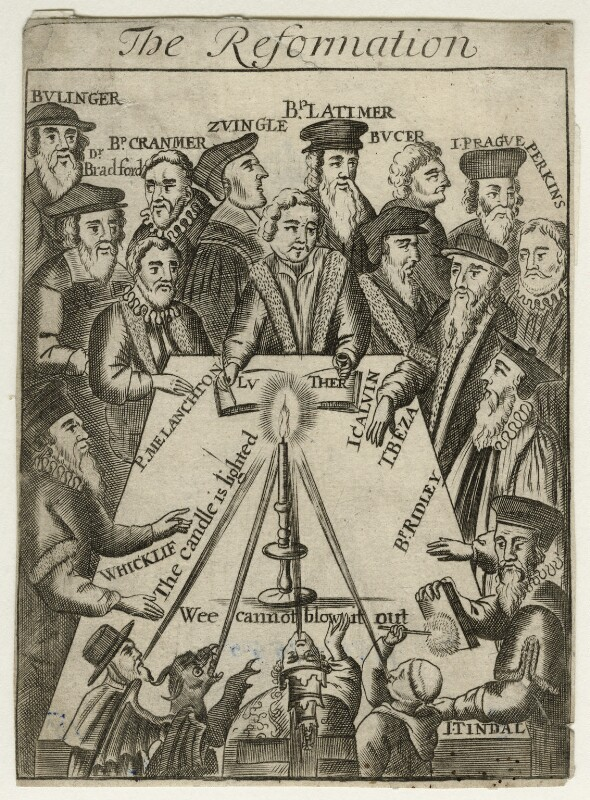
The Candle is Lighted, We Can Not Blow it Out, c. 1683

The Candle is Lighted, We Can Not Blow it Out refers to a series of engravings featuring a set of Protestant reformers seated around a candle on a table. The central figure is Martin Luther, surrounded by both contemporary and historical Protestant reformers. Opposite him is a group of Catholics trying to blow the candle out. Often the first part of the text is pointing towards the bible, on which the light of the candle is shining, and the second part of the text is somewhat hidden under the puffs of breath coming from the Catholic objectors. Sometimes the candle is labelled "Evangelarium" or Gospels.

Little is known of the origins of the text, but many assume the popularity of the scene in English means it was a 17th-century English invention. Luther with his bible translations and the other reformers through their questions regarding papal bulls and so forth have shed light on the bible, but they must protect it from the Catholics (the bull represents the papal bulls) who would wish to plunge it into darkness. Sometimes the text has the footnote Matthew 6.

A German, Dutch, and Latin inscription is known.

== Known engravings from which paintings were modelled ==
In this engraving-painting pair showing 16 reformers and 6 theologians, the men sitting around the table are identified as A John Wycliffe, B Jan Hus, C Jerome of Prague, D Ulrich Zwingli, E Martin Luther, F John Oecolampadius, G Martin Bucer, H John Calvin, I Philip Melanchthon, K Peter Martyr Vermigli, L John Knox, M Matthias Flacius, N Heinrich Bullinger, O Hieronymus Zanchi, P Theodore Beza, and Q William Perkins.

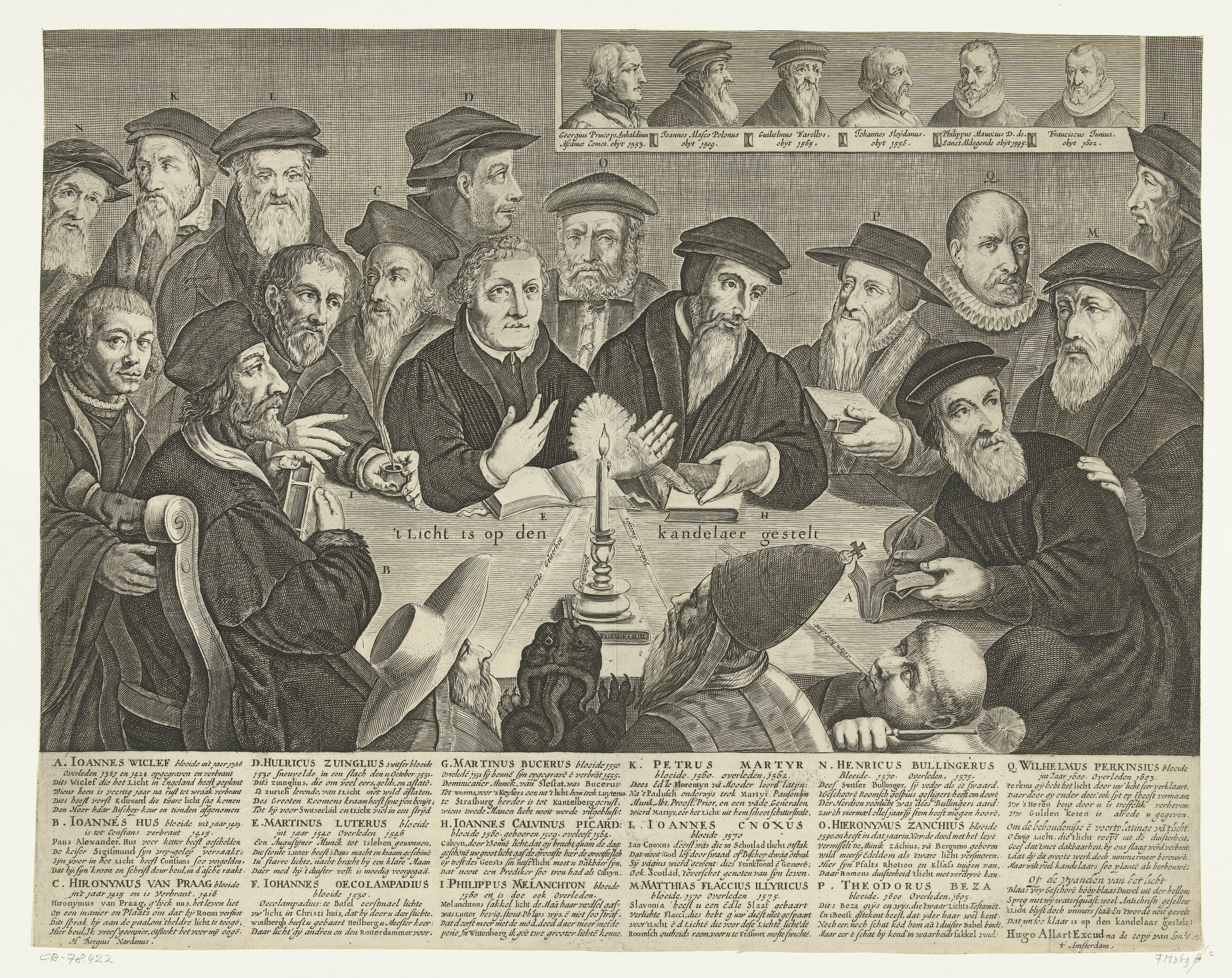
Het licht is op den kandelaar gestelt, Rijksmuseum prints and drawings

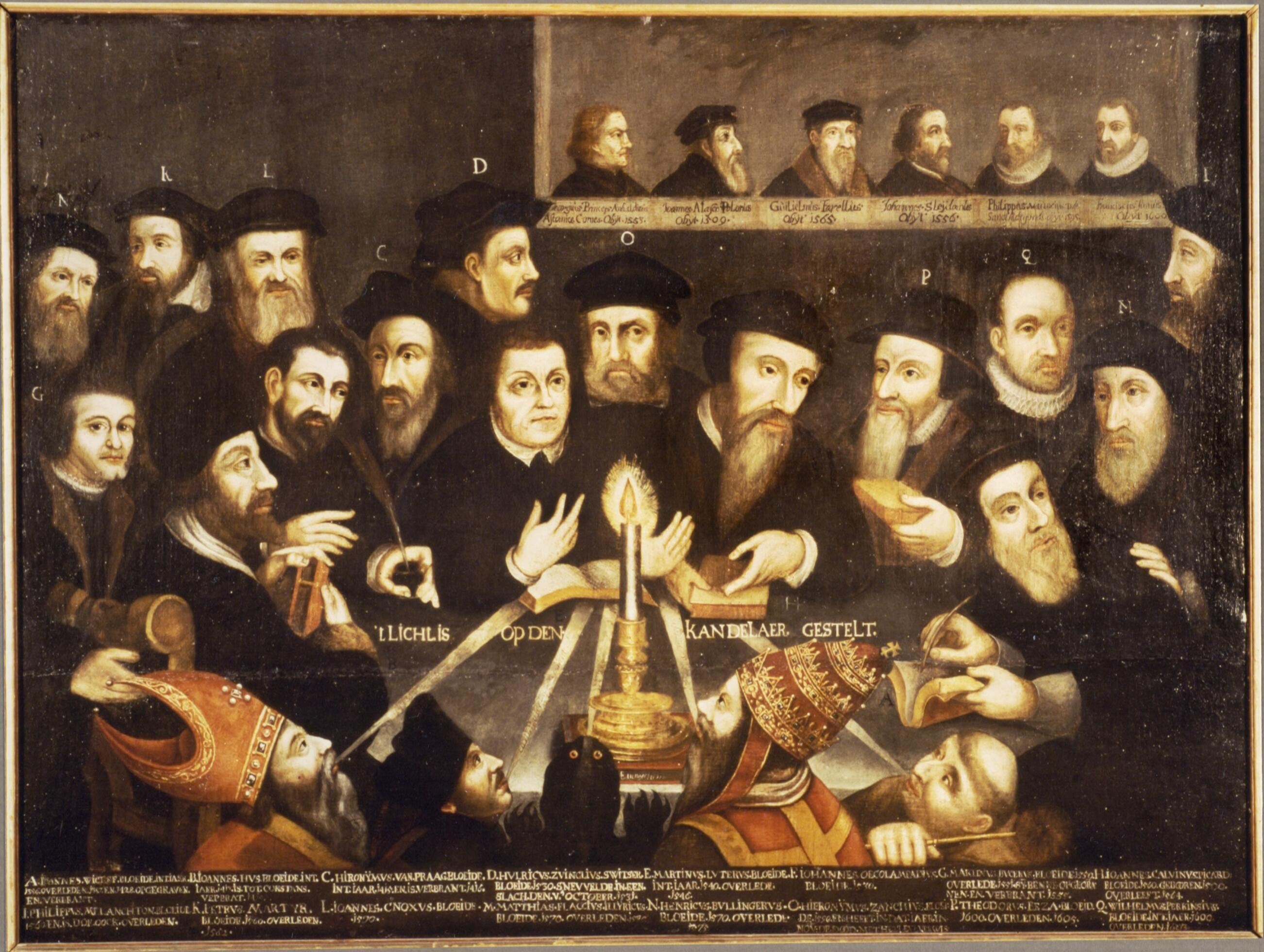
Het licht is op den kandelaar gestelt, Museum Catharijneconvent

Above the heads of the men around the table are the heads of six "protesting" theologians, heroes of the Reformation movement: Georgius Princeps Anhaldinus, died 1553, Johannes Alasco, died 1509, William Farel, died 1565, Johannes Sleidanus, died 1556, Philip Mauxius, died 1595 in St Aldegonde, and Franciscus Junius, died 1602.

In this engraving-painting pair the same scene is depicted, but the "historical theologians" are in circular portraits and in the painting, the Dutch text has been overpainted. Both the engraving and the painting were created in the 17th-century.

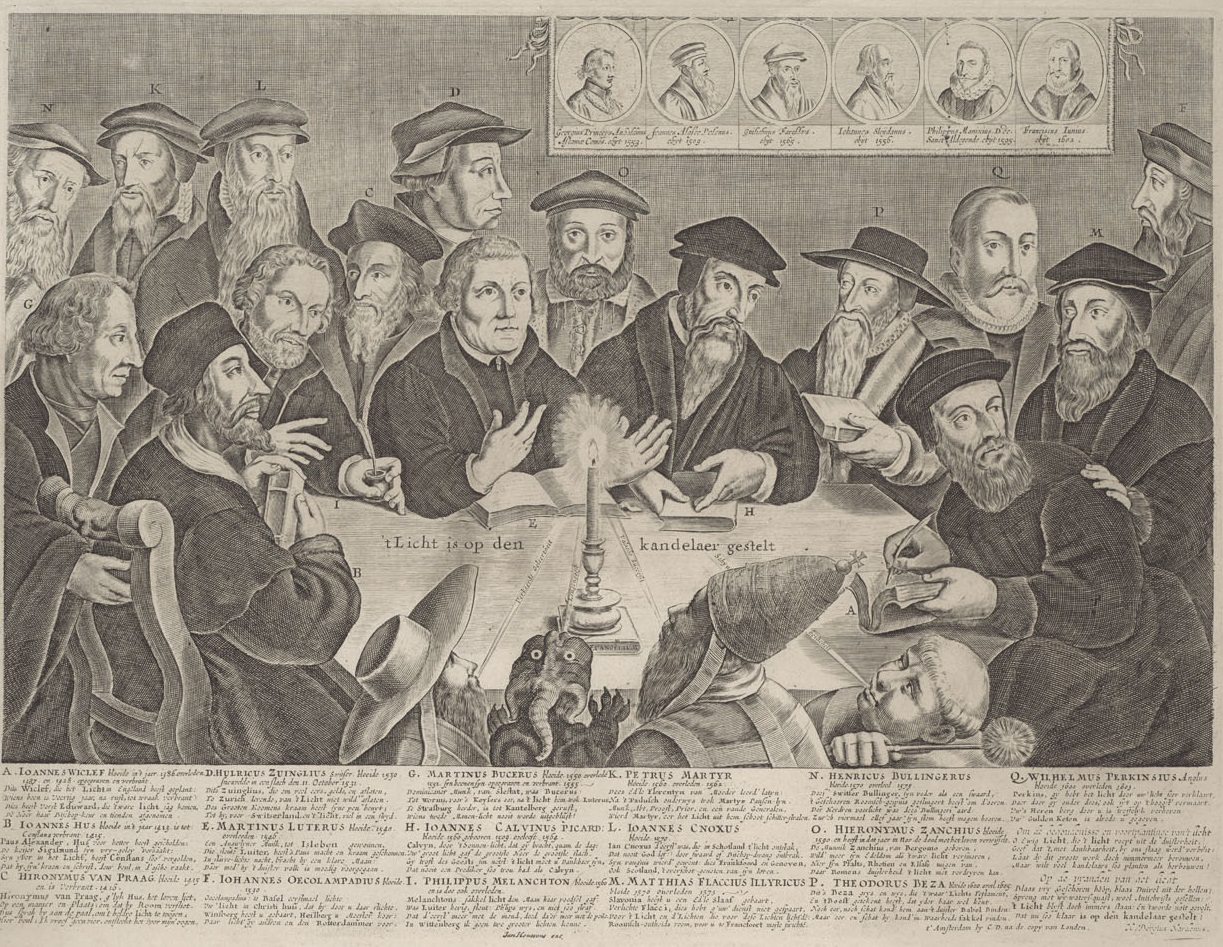
Het licht is op den kandelaar gestelt, Koninklijke Bibliotheek, Netherlands

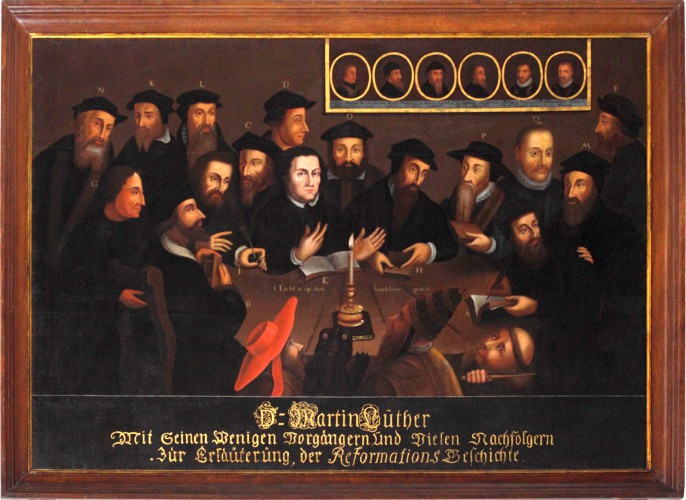
Het licht is op den kandelaer gestelt, Sankt Petri Schule

In this engraving-painting pair showing 15 reformers, the men standing around the table are identified as Heinrich Bullinger, Hieronymus Zanchi, John Knox, Ulrich Zwingli, Peter Martyr Vermigli, Martin Bucer, Jerome of Prague, and William Perkins. Seated are Jan Hus, Philip Melanchthon, Martin Luther, John Calvin, Theodore Beza, and John Wycliffe.

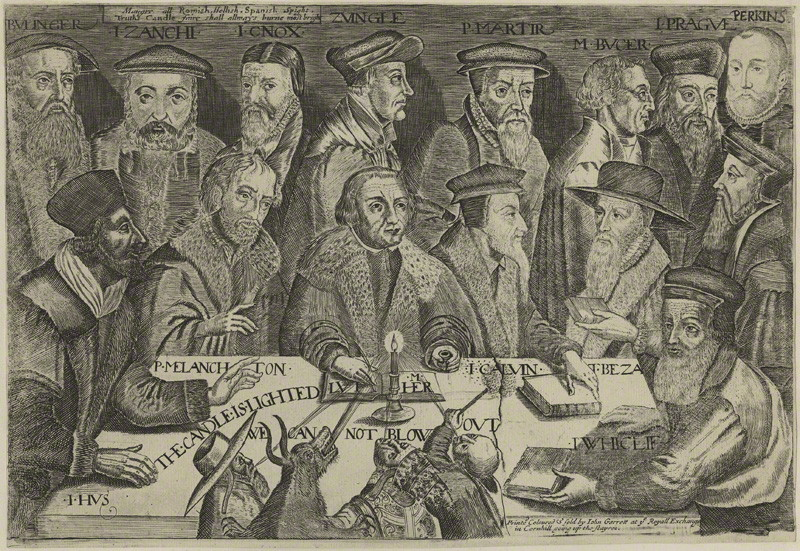
Leading Theologians of the Middle Ages, National Portrait Gallery, London

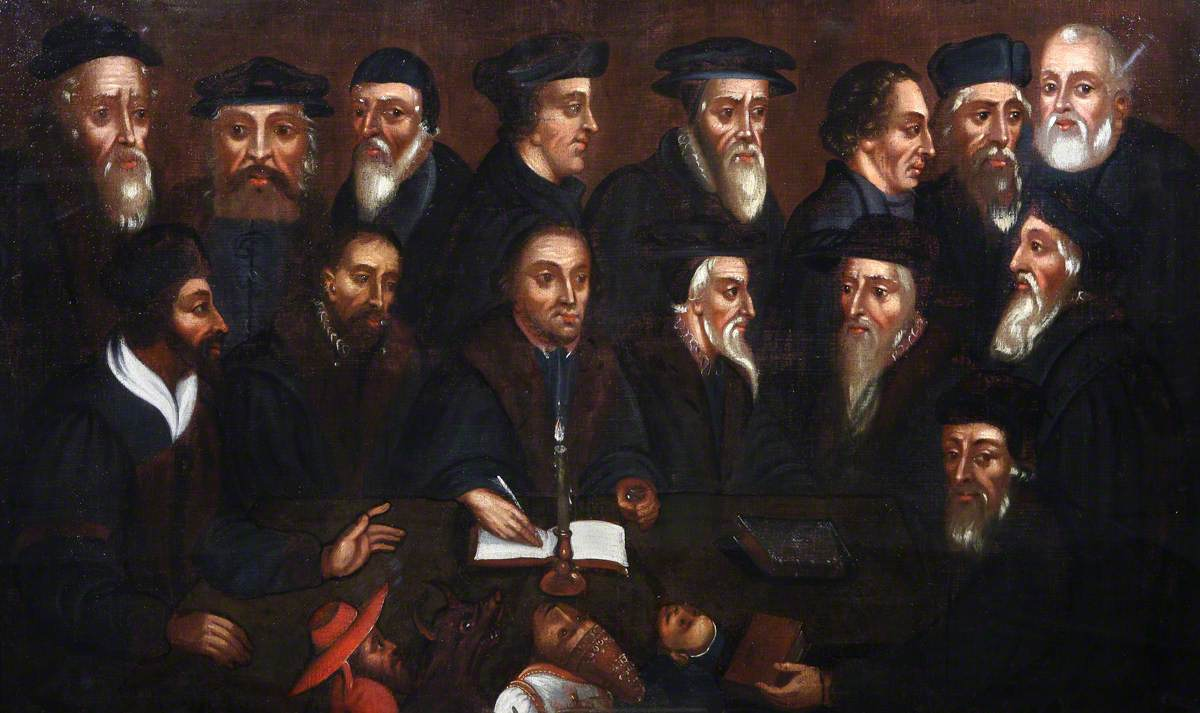
The Protestant Reformers, Perth and Kinross council
