= Slab serif =

Type of serif typeface

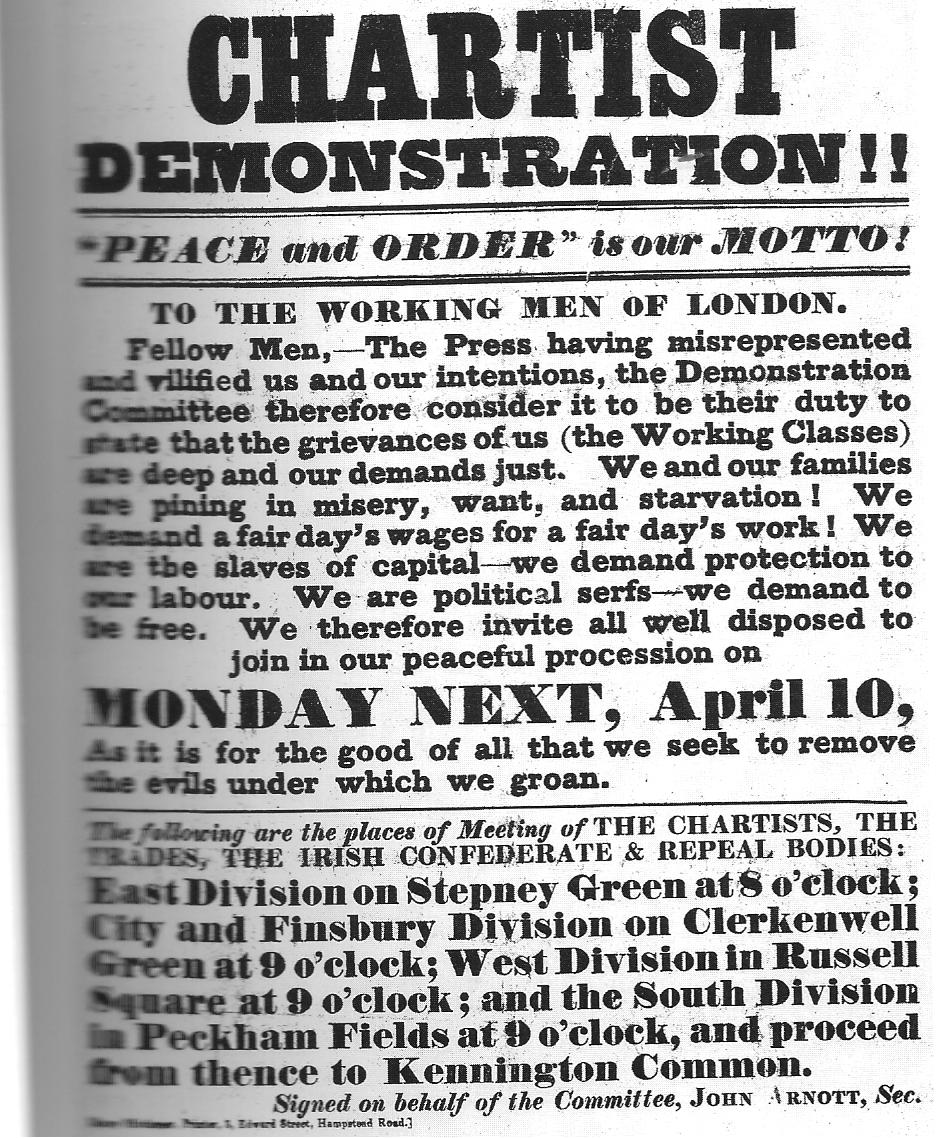
Slab-serif type on the heading of a Chartist poster, 1848. Some headings and the lower passage are in Didone type, but much body text is slab serif.

In typography, a slab serif (also called mechanistic, square serif, antique or Egyptian) typeface is a type of serif typeface characterized by thick, block-like serifs. Serif terminals may be either blunt and angular (Rockwell), or rounded (Courier). Slab serifs were introduced in the early nineteenth century.

Slab serifs form a large and varied genre. Some, such as Memphis and Rockwell, have a geometric design with minimal variation in stroke width: they are sometimes described as sans-serif fonts with added serifs. Others such as those of the Clarendon genre have a structure more like most other serif fonts, though with larger and more obvious serifs. These designs may have bracketed serifs which increase width along their length before merging with the main strokes of the letters, while on geometrics the serifs have a constant width.

Display-oriented slab serifs are often extremely bold, intended to grab the reader's attention on a poster, while slab serifs oriented towards legibility at small sizes show less extreme characteristics. Some fonts oriented towards small print use and printing on poor-quality newsprint paper may have slab serifs to increase legibility, while their other features are closer to conventional book type fonts.

Slab serif fonts were also often used in typewriters, most famously Courier, and this tradition has meant many monospaced text fonts intended for computer and programming use are slab serif designs.

== History ==
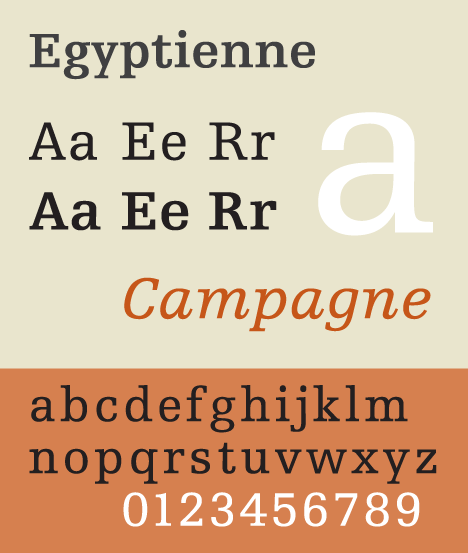
A sample of the typeface Egyptienne, a slab serif face based on the Clarendon model.

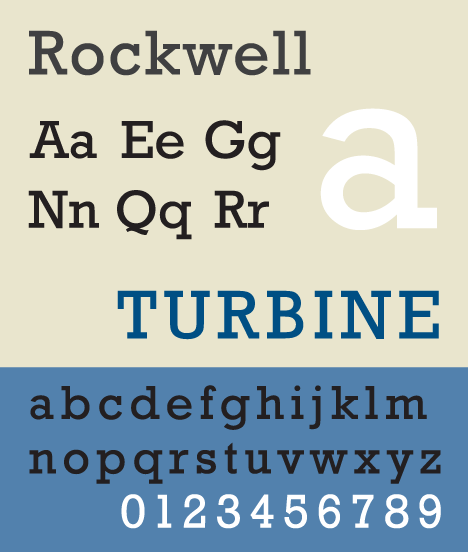
A sample of the typeface Rockwell, a slab serif face based on the geometric model.

A sample of the typeface Courier, a slab serif face based on strike-on typewriting faces.

Slab serif lettering and typefaces appeared rapidly in the early nineteenth century, having little in common with previous letterforms. As the printing of advertising material began to expand in the early nineteenth century, new and notionally more attention-grabbing letterforms became popular. Poster-size types began to be developed that were not merely magnified forms of book type, but very different and bolder. Some were developments of designs of the previous fifty years: ultra-bold types known as "fat faces", which were related to "Didone" text faces of the period but much bolder. Others had completely new structures: sans-serif letters, based on classical antiquity, and reverse-contrast letterforms. Some of the type designs appearing around this time may be based on signpainting and architectural lettering traditions, or vice versa. (Note: This can make tracing the descent of sans and slab-serif styles hard, since a trend can arrive in print directly and without apparent precedent from a signpainting tradition which has left less of a record.)

The first known example of a slab-serif letterform is woodblock lettering on an 1810 lottery advertisement from London. Slab-serif type was perhaps first introduced by London typefounder Vincent Figgins under the name "Antique", appearing in a type-specimen dated 1815 (but probably issued in 1817). (Note: Whether Figgins' foundry produced the very first slab-serif is a question that is unlikely to be ever confirmed, but Nicolete Gray felt that "it seems probable" as his is the first foundry with a surviving specimen showing them. This first Figgins specimen to show them was an "1815" specimen containing 1817 watermarked paper, held by Oxford University Press; other 1815-dated Figgins specimens do not show it; another "1815" specimen that was held by Stephenson Blake with 1820 on the spine shows more. No specimens are known from Figgins' main rivals who produced many slab serifs, the Caslon and Thorne (later Thorowgood) foundries, over the relevant period. Figgins had four sizes in c. 1817, nine c. 1820, and nineteen in a specimen dated 1821 but containing 1823 pages; no Caslon specimens are known between 1816 and 1821 but the first surviving specimen from Caslon to show slab-serifs dates from 1821 and shows eleven sizes. Thorne had four sizes in 1820. Even fewer specimens survive from other foundries; none are known from Bower and Bacon between 1813 and 1826, by which time they had eighteen sizes. Gray concluded that any of Figgins, Thorowgood and Caslon could have been first to issue a lower-case (already seen on the 1810 woodblock), as they all introduced ones around 1820.)

Writing in 1825, the printer Thomas Curson Hansard wrote with amusement that slab-serif and other such display types were 'the outrageous kind of face only adapted for placards, posting-bills, invitations to the wheel of Fortune...Fashion and Fancy commonly frolic from one extreme to another.'

Slab serifs declined following the growing popularity of sans-serif faces, with which they always competed. Notable collections of original wood type are held by the Hamilton in Wisconsin and the University of Texas at Austin, collected by Rob Roy Kelly, writer of a well-known book on American poster types. Adobe Inc. has published a large collection of digitisations inspired by nineteenth-century wood type.

Following Napoleon's Egyptian campaign and dissemination of images and descriptions via publications like Description de l'Égypte (1809) an intense cultural fascination with all things Egyptian followed. Suites of contemporary parlor furniture were produced resembling furniture found in tombs. Multicolored woodblock printed wallpaper could make a dining room in Edinburgh or Chicago feel like Luxor. While there was no relationship between Egyptian writing systems and slab serif types, either shrewd marketing or honest confusion led to slab serifs often being called Egyptians. Historian James Mosley has shown that the first typefaces and letters called 'Egyptian' were apparently all sans-serifs.

The term Egyptian was adopted by French and German foundries, where it became Egyptienne. A lighter style of slab serif with a single width of strokes was called 'engravers face' since it resembled the monoline structure of metal engravings. The term 'slab-serif' itself is relatively recent, possibly twentieth-century.

Because of the clear, bold nature of the large serifs, designs with some slab serif characteristics are also often used for small print, for example in printing with typewriters and on newsprint paper. For example, Linotype's Legibility Group, in which most newspapers were printed during much of the twentieth century, were based on the "Ionic" or "Clarendon" style adapted for continuous body text.

More loosely, Joanna, TheSerif, FF Meta Serif, Guardian Egyptian, and Merriweather are other examples of newspaper and small print-orientated typefaces that have regular, monoline serifs (sometimes more visible in bold weights) but a general humanist text face structure not particularly influenced by nineteenth-century stylings (as Clarendons are). The term "humanist slab serif" has been applied to serif text faces in this style.

Describing the process of designing slab serifs, modern font designers Jonathan Hoefler and Tobias Frere-Jones note that the structure of the large slab serifs imposes compromises on structure, with purely geometric designs harder to create in ultra-bold sizes where it becomes impossible to create a strictly monoline lower-case alphabet, and Clarendon-style designs harder to create in a lighter style.

== Sub-classifications ==
There are several main subgroups of slab serif typefaces:

=== Antique model ===
The earliest slab-serifs were often called "antiques" or "Egyptians". They were often quite monoline in construction and had similarities to nineteenth-century serif fonts, such as ball terminals.

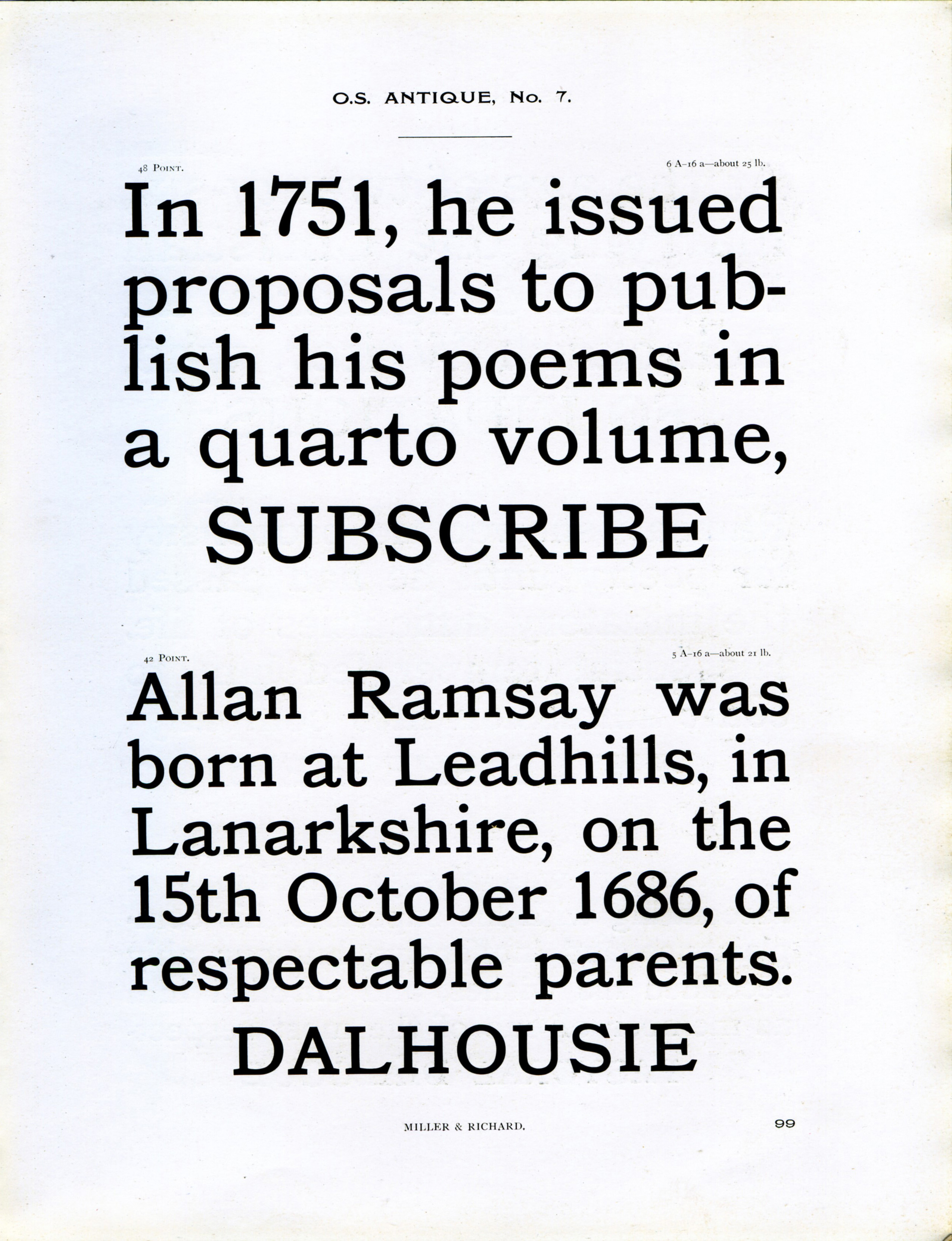
Miller and Richard's Oldstyle Antique. Just as Clarendon typefaces took the "Didone" or modern-face model as a basis for a slab-serif, it is based on their "Old Style" design inspired by type designs of the eighteenth century, made slightly bolder and lower in contrast. Originally intended for use as a bolder type for emphasis, it was often used for general-purpose body text for example if legibility was considered important. Bookman is a derivative of this style.

=== Clarendon model ===
Clarendon typefaces, unlike other slab serifs, actually have some bracketing and some contrast in size in the actual serif: the serifs often have curves so they change width and become wider as they approach the main stroke of the letter. Examples include Clarendon and Egyptienne.

=== Italienne model ===
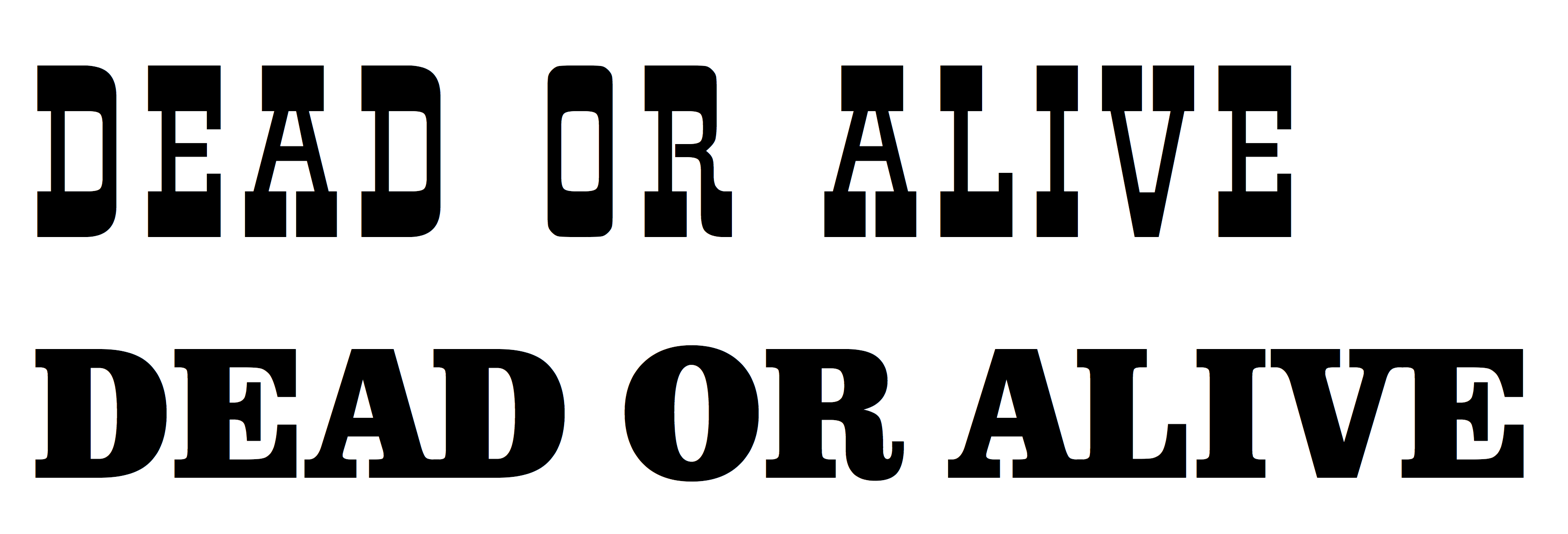
French Clarendon type (top) compared to a conventional Clarendon design.

In the Italienne model, also known as French Clarendon type, the serifs are even heavier than the stems, forging a dramatic, attention-drawing effect. This is known as reverse-contrast type. It is traditionally associated with use in circus and other posters, and is commonly seen in Western films or to create a nineteenth-century atmosphere. It was most popular from the 1860s until the early twentieth century, particularly in the United States, although the basic concept originates from London printing of the 1820s and it was used outside the United States. It has often been revived since, for example by Robert Harling as Playbill and more recently by Adrian Frutiger as Westside.

=== Typewriter typefaces ===
Typewriter slab serif typefaces are named for their use in strike-on typewriting. These faces originated in monospaced format with fixed-width, meaning that every character takes up exactly the same amount of horizontal space. This feature is necessitated by the nature of the typewriter apparatus. Examples include Courier (on the geometric model) and Prestige Elite (on the Clarendon model).

A considerable variety of other names have been used, particularly in the 19th century: at the time the separation between typeface name and genre had yet to become established, so it is not clear if a name describes a specific typeface or is meant to refer to a subgenre. For example, slab serifs on the French Clarendon model were also called 'Celtic', 'Belgian', 'Aldine' and 'Teutonic' by American printers, as well as 'Tuscan', a name which refers to slab serifs with diamond-shaped points, called median spurs, on the sides of the letterform.

=== Geometric model ===
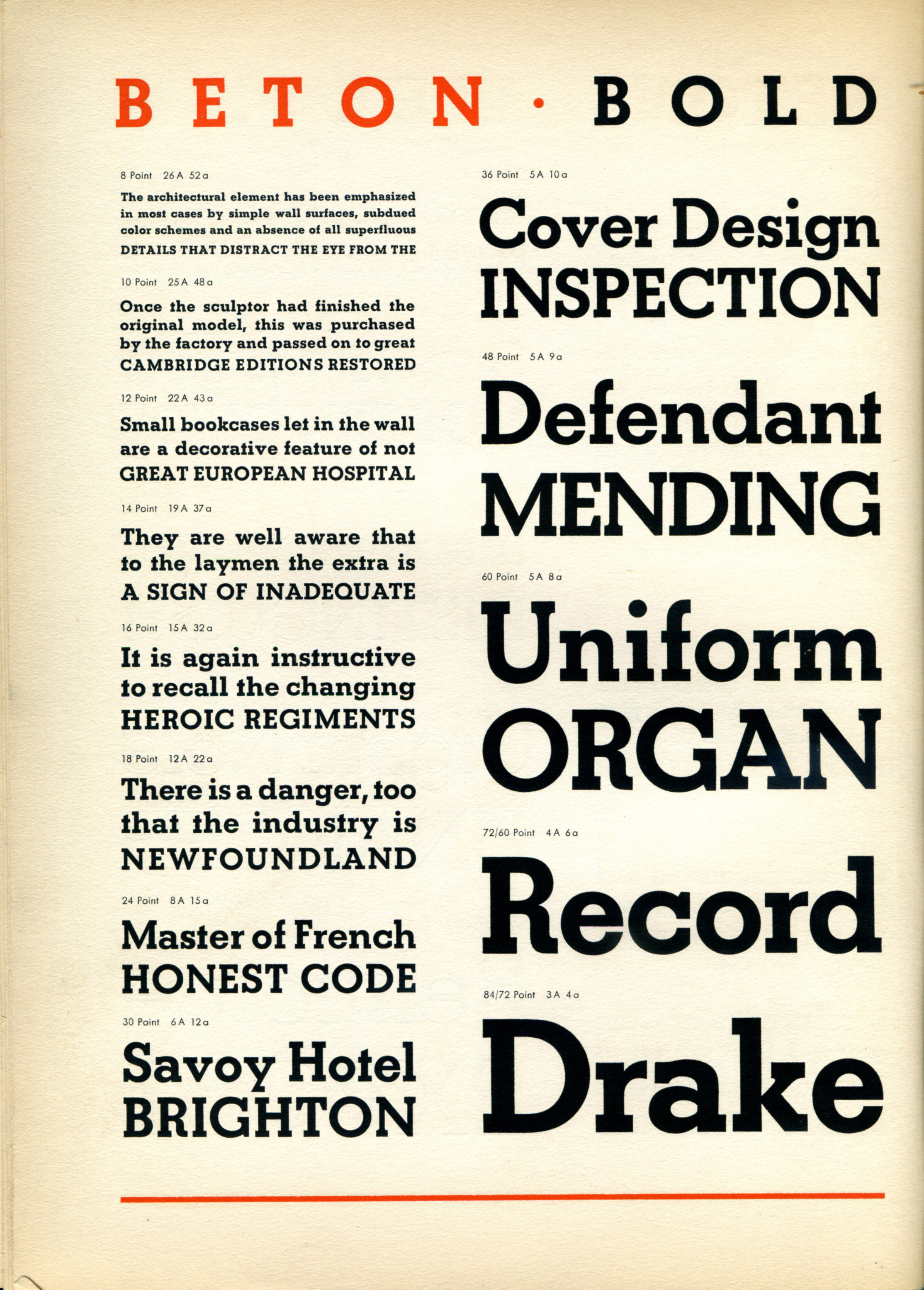
Beton Bold in a metal type sample. Contrast is minimal and letterforms take the circle as a basic shape.

Geometric designs have no bracketing and evenly weighted stems and serifs. Early examples include Memphis, Rockwell, Karnak, Beton, Rosmini, City and Tower, several of which were influenced by geometric sans-serifs of the 1920s and 30s, especially Futura. Recent well-known geometric sans-serifs include ITC Lubalin, Neutraface Slab and Archer.

Some monoline slab serifs such as Serifa, Helserif and Roboto Slab have been designed under the influence of neo-grotesque sans-serif fonts of the 1950s and 60s onwards, and these may be called "neo-grotesque" slab serifs.

=== Humanist model ===
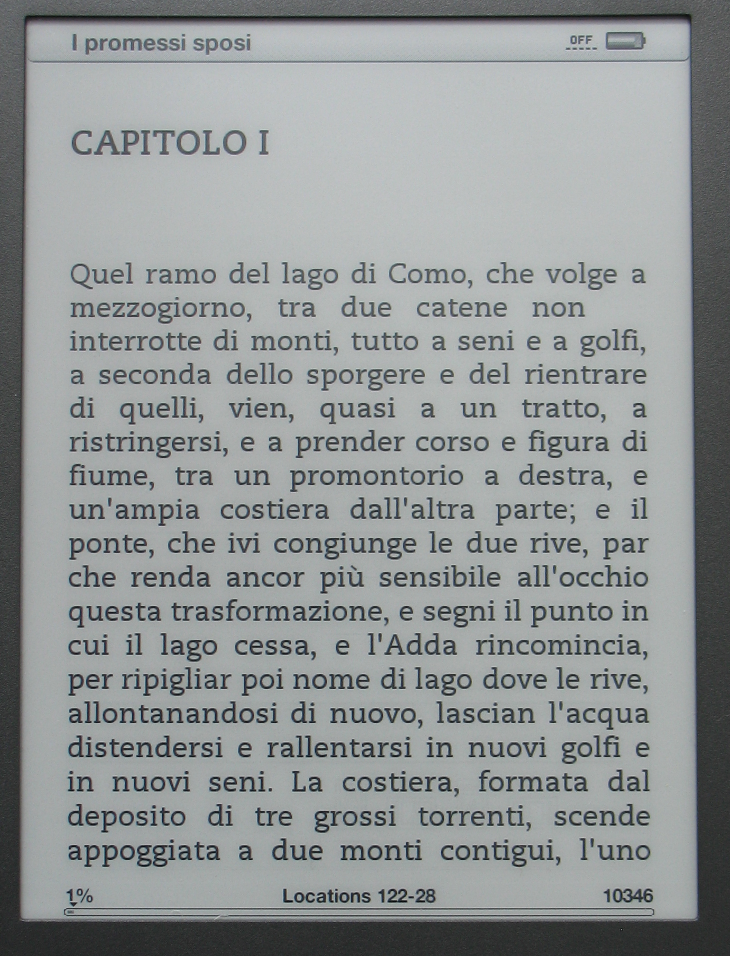
The humanist slab-serif PNM Caecilia on an Amazon Kindle

Humanist slab-serifs have designs suitable for body text, with relatively "natural" proportions influenced by handwriting.

== See also ==
- List of slab-serif typefaces
