= Fann Street =

Street in the City of London

Coordinates: 51.522°N 0.0969°W

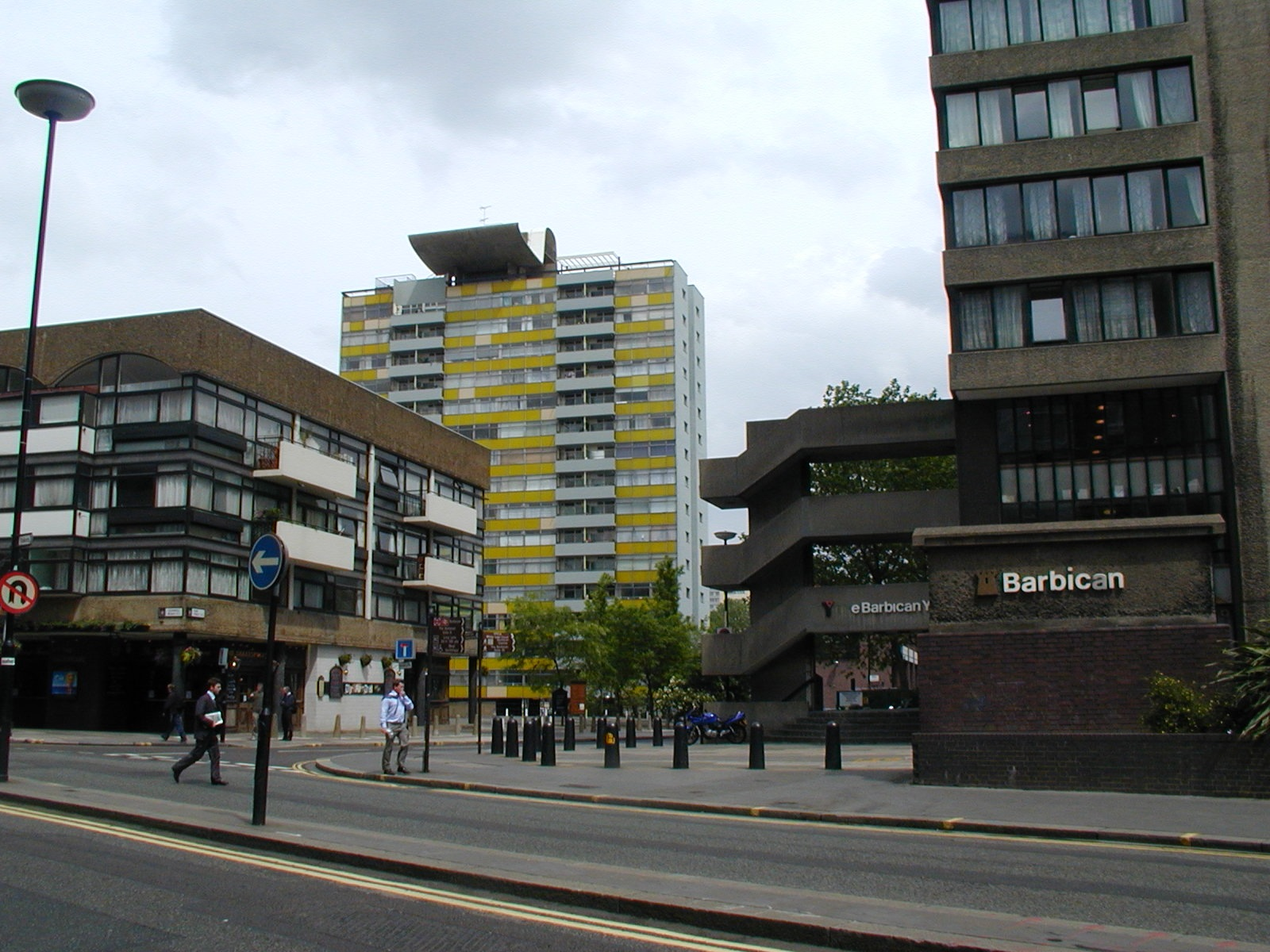
View from Aldersgate Street, looking down Fann Street

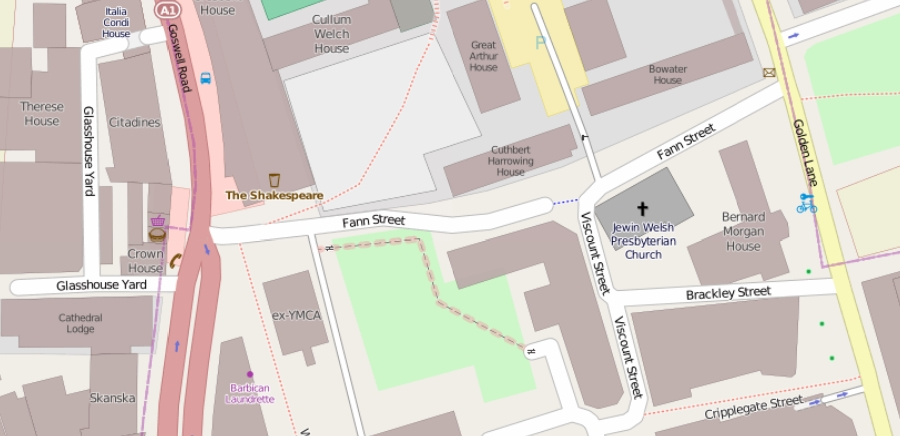
The immediate vicinity of Fann Street

Fann Street is a street in the City of London, England.

It runs west–east, from its junction with Aldersgate Street and Goswell Road in the west, to the junction with Golden Lane in the east.

In its original form of Fann's Alley the street was almost certainly named after a former owner or builder in the seventeenth century, and a likely candidate is Stephen Fann, carpenter, whose 1613 will states that he had property in the Precinct of 'Goswelstrete'. Despite the claim made by the plaque placed by the Worshipful Company of Fan Makers on the Jewin Chapel in this street, the name has no connection with the making of fans.

In 1802, Robert Thorne moved his type foundry to a former brewery in Fann Street, and renamed it the Fann Street Foundry. On his death in 1820, the business was bought by William Thorowgood. Thorowgood created the typeface Grotesque. In 1838, the typographer Robert Besley, the creator of Clarendon the first patented typeface in 1845, joined the Fann Street Foundry.

The former YMCA Building at 2 Fann Street has been renamed Blake Tower and has been redeveloped to create 72 luxury apartments.

A history of the street and its former inhabitants has been provided by Anthony Camp in On the City's edge: A History of Fann Street, London (2016, ISBN 978-0-9503308-3-9).
