= Fat face =

Style of display typeface and lettering

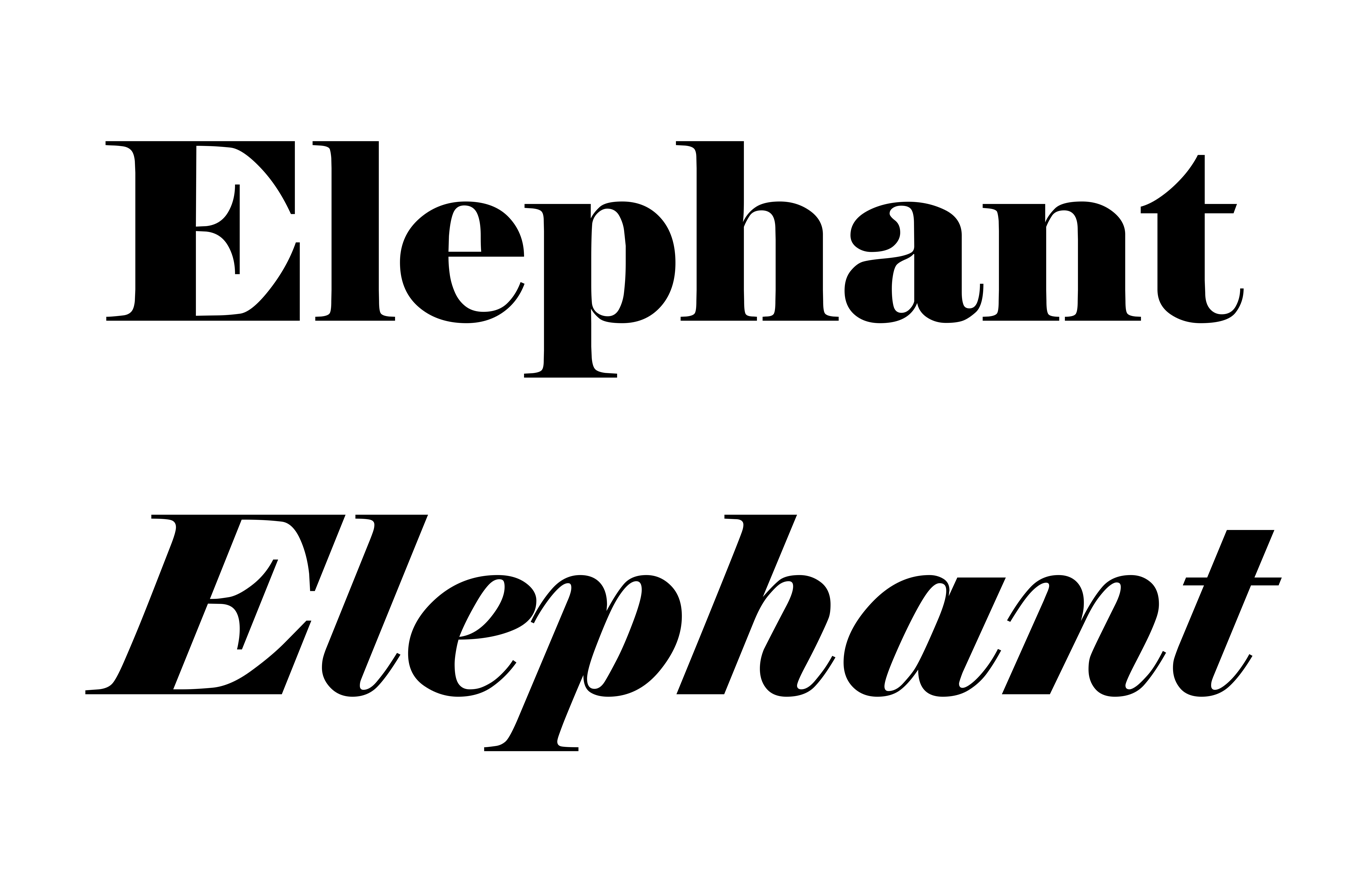
Elephant is a digital fat face typeface by Matthew Carter based on the typefaces of Vincent Figgins.

In typography, a fat face letterform is a serif typeface or piece of lettering in the Didone or modern style with an extremely bold design. Fat face typefaces appeared in London around 1805–1810 and became widely popular; John Lewis describes the fat face as "the first real display typeface." (Note: Although note that, unsurprisingly, other authors have had different views: for instance Fred Smeijers describes Hendrik van den Keere's large heavy types of the 1560s make him "one of the first to make roman display types that were explicitly conceived as such.")

While decorated typefaces and lettering styles existed in the past, for instance inline and shadowed forms, the fat faces' extreme design and their issue in very large poster sizes had an immediate impact on display typography in the early nineteenth century. Historian James Mosley describes a fat face as "designed like a naval broadside to sock its commercial message ... by sheer aggressive weight of heavy metal." and that (unlike slab serif typefaces) "while the thick lines were very thick, the thin ones remained the same - or in proportion, very thin indeed."

The same style of letters was also widely used executed as custom lettering rather than as a typeface in the nineteenth century, in architecture, on tombstones and on signage. Versions were executed as roman or upright, italics and with designs inside the main bold strokes of the letter, such as a white line, patterns or decorations such as fruits or flowers. They are different in style to the slab serif typefaces which appeared shortly afterwards, in which the serifs themselves are also made bold in weight.

== Historical background ==
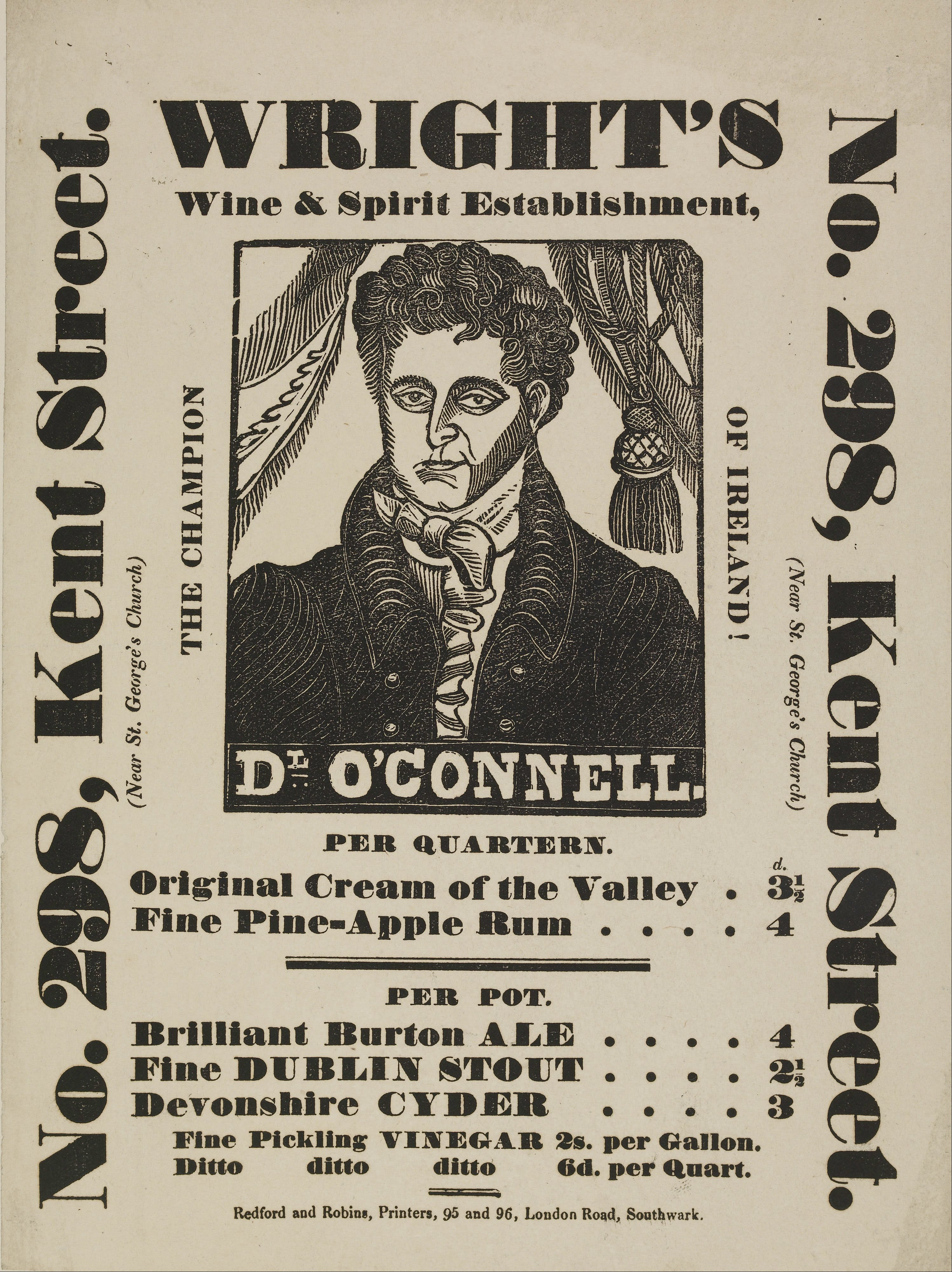
London poster, c. 1840s

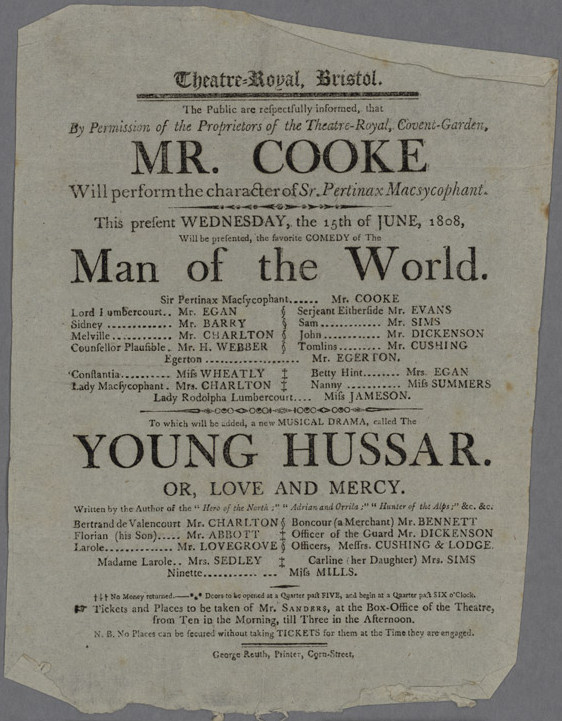
Early theatre poster, 1808: all text is in fonts similar to body text faces.

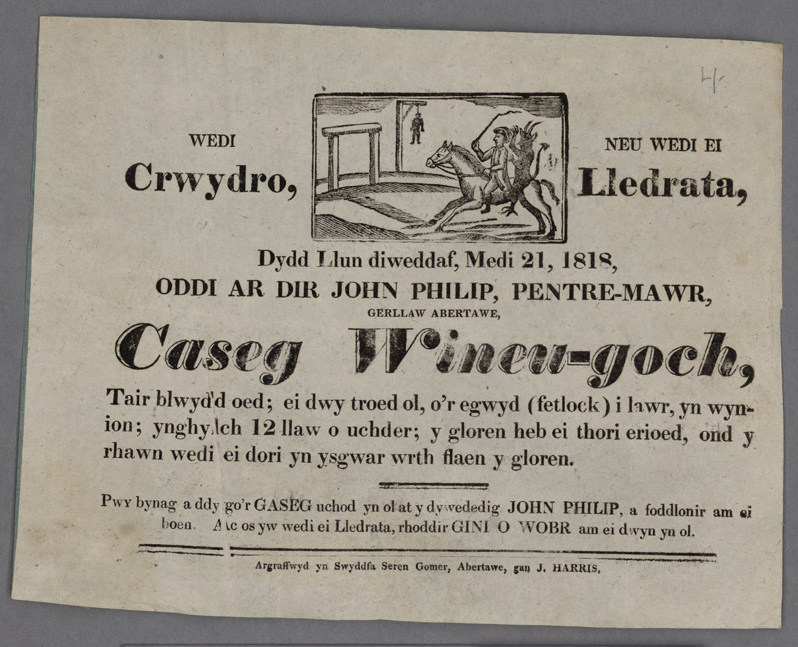
1818 poster; complete change in style. Fat face, or at least bold, letterforms used throughout; the main heading is in an inline italic design.

Great changes took place in the style of printed letters available from type foundries in the hundred years after 1750. At the beginning of this period, fonts in Latin-alphabet printing were predominantly intended for book printing. The modern concept of text faces having companion bold fonts did not exist, although some titling capitals were quite bold; if a bolder effect was intended blackletter might be used.

From the arrival of roman type around 1475 to the late eighteenth century, relatively little development in letter design took place, as most fonts of the period were intended for body text, and they stayed relatively similar in design, generally ignoring local styles of lettering or newer "pointed-pen" styles of calligraphy. (Note: This was not the only way in which fonts could appear different, however: differences in x-height, spacing, condensation and colour on the page can make body text fonts look different in design even if individual letters are not that different.)

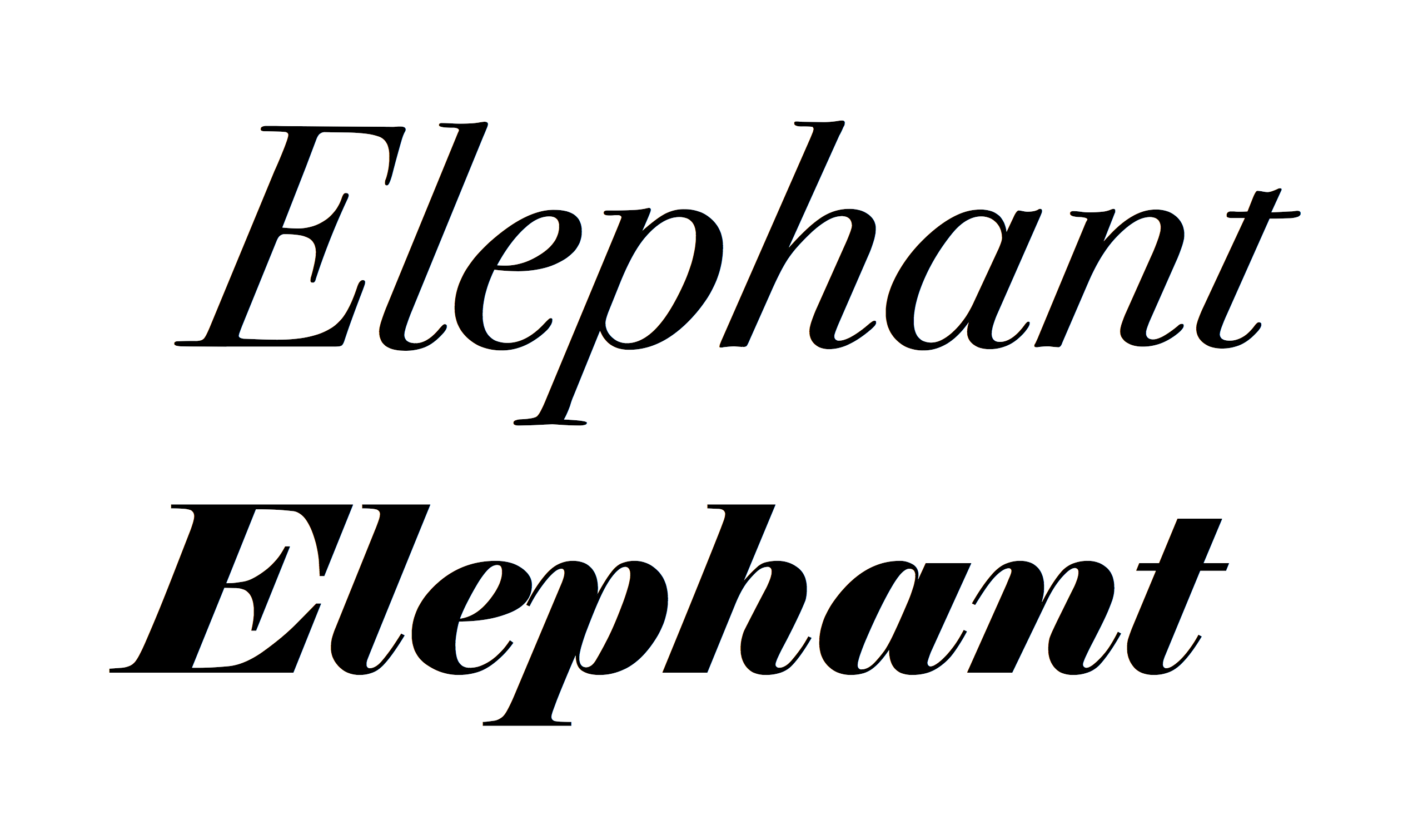
Fat face types have the thin horizontals of modern-face types like Bodoni (top), but much thicker vertical strokes.

Starting in the late seventeenth century, typefounders developed what are now called transitional and then Didone types. These typefaces had daringly slender horizontals and serif details, catching up to the steely calligraphy and copperplate engraving styles of the period, that could show off the increasingly high quality of paper and printing technology of the period. In addition, Didone typefaces had a strictly vertical stress: without exception, the vertical lines were thicker than the horizontals, creating a much more geometric and modular design. (Note: Didone types were at the time called 'modern' for their sophisticated image; the name has fallen from use as they have become less common in body text from around the end of the nineteenth century.)

A major development of the early nineteenth century was the arrival of the printed poster and increasing use of printing for publicity and advertising material. This presumably caused a desire to make eye-catching new types of letters available for printing. Large typefaces clearly intended for poster use began to appear in London in the second half of the eighteenth century, introduced by the typefounders Thomas Cottrell and by William Caslon II by 1764, although casting large metal type in sand for book titles was used for centuries before that. Caslon's were apparently marketed for use by stagecoach services, with lists of towns on the specimen sheets. Although influenced by a textbook on architectural lettering, they still remained similar to magnified body text forms, rather than a new departure, although they did establish one precedent later followed by both fat face typefaces and modern face types generally, that numerals were at a fixed height rather than the old text figures of variable height. (Note: Caslon II's numerals, like many early examines of modern "lining" figures, are slightly below cap height.)

The term "fat face" itself is older than the modern genre. Meaning typefaces bolder than normal weight (but only slightly, by modern standards) it was used in 1683 by Joseph Moxon as "a broad-stemmed letter". Reference books on printing from the nineteenth century also used it to refer to new Didone typefaces that were bolder than before but still intended for printing body text or poetry.

== First appearances ==
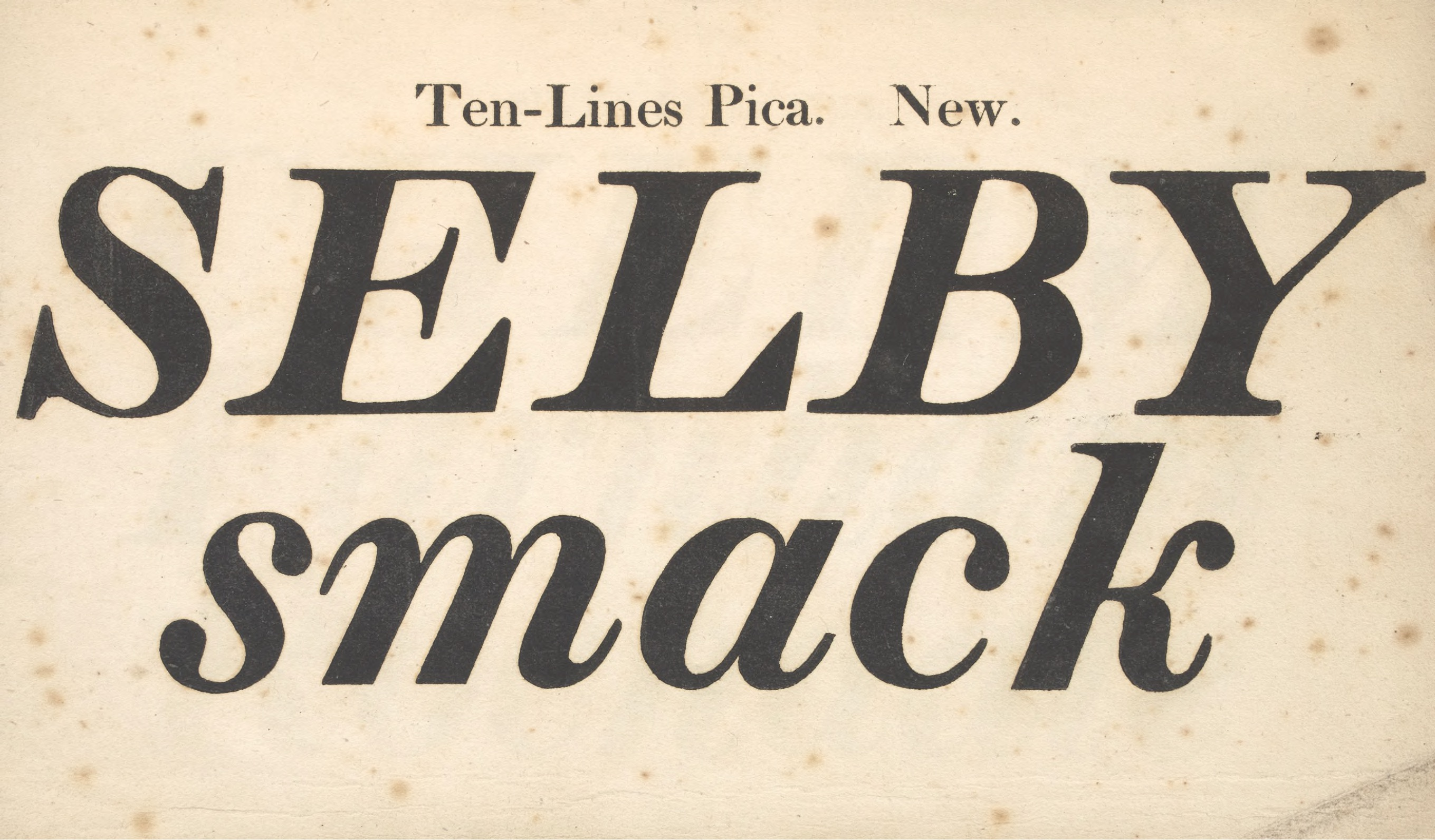
Early typeface in what became the fat face style by Robert Thorne in his 1803 specimen

According to Mosley, "the growth [of fat face letters] from existing models can be continuously traced. There is a clear parallel to it in contemporary architectural lettering...in printing types its fatness was steadily increased". (Note: Writers on the history of printing have discussed the increasing boldness of fat face-style types in the early nineteenth century as a transition from bold designs to truly fat typefaces, although it is not clear that nineteenth-century printers made any distinction. According to Alfred F. Johnson, bold typefaces begin to appear in the 1800s with the more extreme fat face types appearing on advertisements for the state lottery from around 1810. The Fry Foundry's French Canon No. 2 of around 1806 has been described as a "semi-fat face"; in the opinion of Paul Barnes the letterforms in Thorne's specimen of 1803 are not yet true fat faces, only bold. Nicolete Gray in her book Nineteenth Century Ornamented Typefaces describes the Fry Foundry's as an early paradigm but not quite the "fully developed fat face": "a superb, wide, generous letter, magnificently roman, but with a good deal less of order and more of pomp than Trajan's classic. It is the same style as the best English architectural lettering ... it is not a modern face ... this noble letter is merely transitional; by 1815 it has entirely disappeared from the specimen books. It is replaced by the fully developed fat face.")

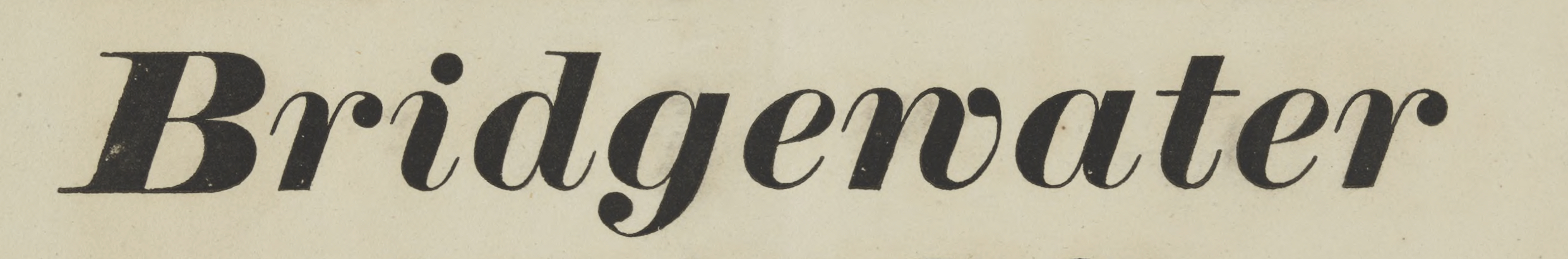
An early example, not particularly bold, of c. 1816. This style of 'W' was common in roundhand calligraphy.

Two contemporary sources concurred that fat face letters were popularised by the typefounder Robert Thorne. He had been an apprentice to Thomas Cottrell, who pioneered large-size poster types, before setting up his own company, often called the Fann Street Foundry, in North London. According to Thomas Curson Hansard (1825), "the extremely bold and fat letter, now prevalent in job-printing, owes its introduction principally to Mr. Thorne, a spirited and successful letter-founder" and according to William Savage (1822) he "has been principally instrumental in the revolution that has taken place in Posting Bills by the introduction of fat types." Unfortunately, few typeface specimen books from the period or from his foundry survive, making it difficult to confirm this; in addition, typeface specimens of the time generally make no comments at all on the types shown. From his study of specimen books, Sébastien Morlighem does not believe that the escalating trend was entirely driven by Thorne: "a lesser-known, yet decisive, contribution came from the Caslon foundry" and that "it is more accurate to see that several people – punchcutters, founders, printers, publishers – were involved in its development and popularisation".

As to the clients for these types, Mosley writes that "it is tempting to see" the lottery agent Thomas Bish as a force behind them: there were two Thomas Bishes, a father and son who were famous lottery promoters, who were well known for brash, startling advertising. (Note: There were two Thomas Bishes, father and son, who have often been confused or conflated; Mosley did not specify which he had in mind. Both have been extensively discussed in literature on the history of advertising; see following sources.) Mosley highlights as significant a fat face in a later specimen book simply showcased with the single specimen word "Bish", (Note: Specifically, the Caslon foundry specimen of 1830, reprinted in 1841.) and notes that Bish posters began with "heavy roman lettering engraved on wood, for which fat-face types were substituted as they became available". Mosley feels that fat faces had well-designed numerals with a bold design, making them ideal for typesetting adverts with prices.

== Widespread use ==
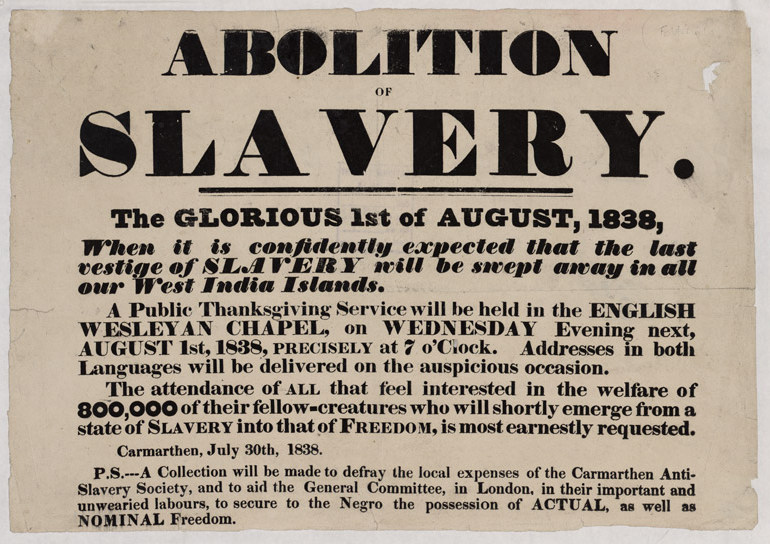
1838: variation of letterform from ultra-bold down to merely bolder than average in the extended text

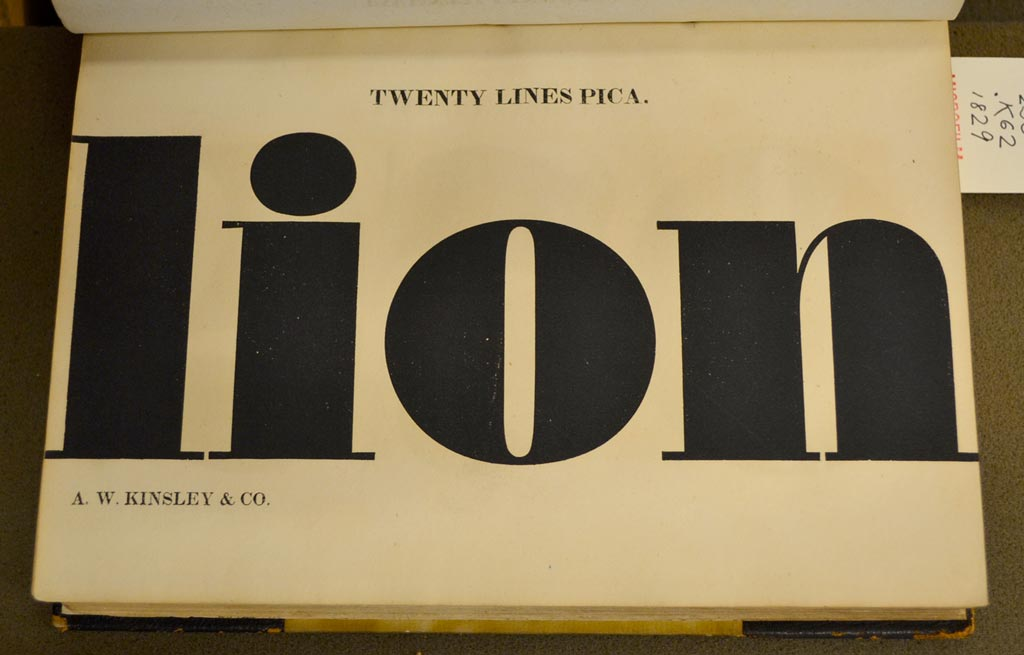
An extremely bold fat face design from A.W. Kinsley & Co., Albany, 1829. The counters have been reduced to abrupt, tiny slits.

Fat faces rapidly became popular. Whereas early poster types and titling capitals were generally only upright, fat faces were made in roman and in italics. Swash capitals for A M N V W Y were quite common; the sample text "VANWAYMAN" was used as a sample text by the Caslon type foundry to showcase them. (Note: It also appears in the White Foundry of New York specimen book of 1831 and the Caslon foundry specimen book of 1841.) They were also made down into quite small sizes.

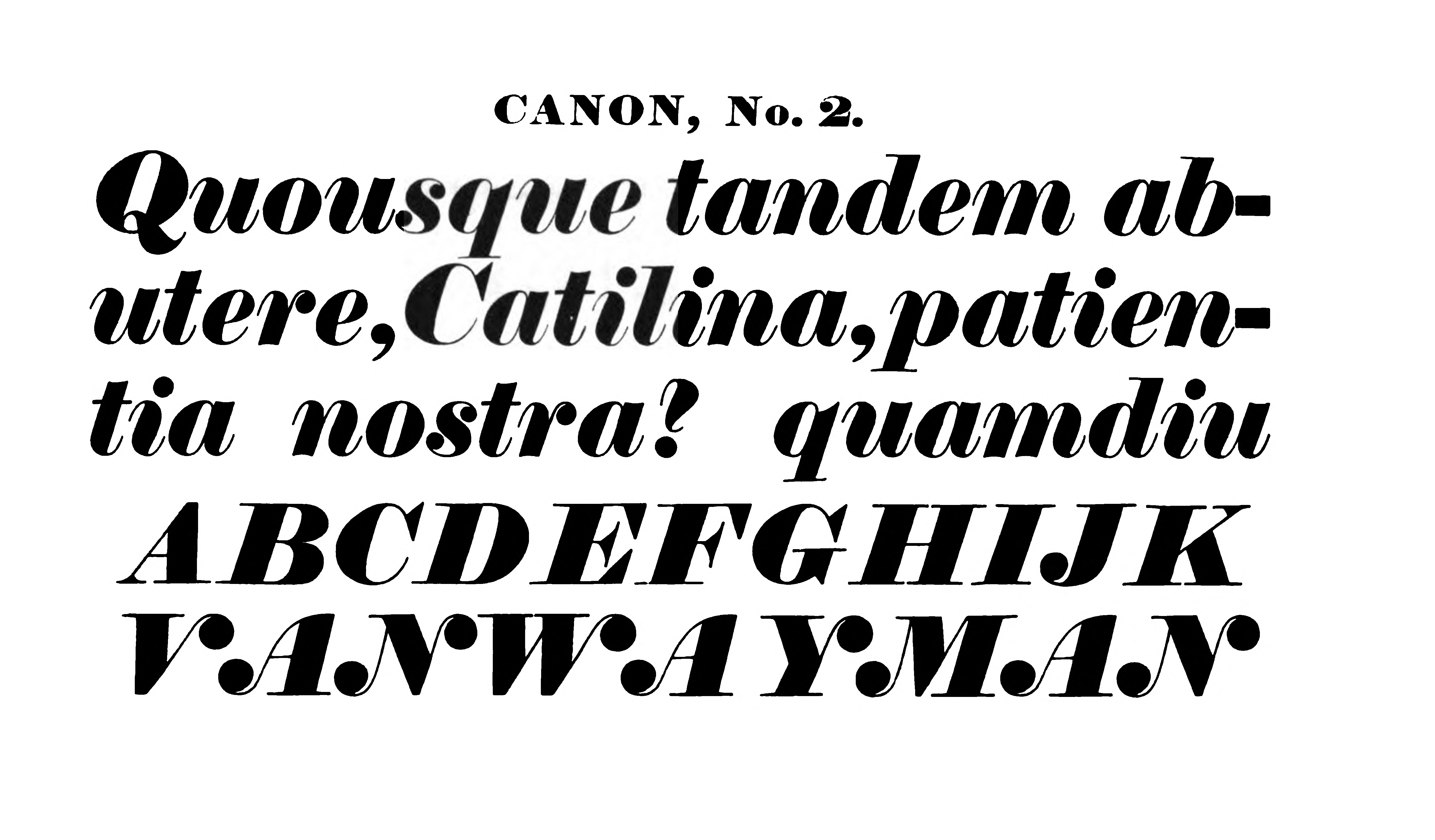
The 1841 Caslon foundry specimen uses "VANWAYMAN" as a sample text for its swash capitals.

Fat faces were also used in the US, where they were used on gravestones. In the United States Barnhurst and Nerone comment that fat face newspaper nameplates were in fashion in the 1810s; later they were often replaced by blackletter.

Mosley has particularly praised those of Vincent Figgins' foundry (digitised by Matthew Carter as Elephant, above): "exaggeration puts a huge strain on the designer if the result is to retain any coherence at all. Whoever cut the fat-faces of Vincent Figgins ... handled the problems with what can only be described as elegance." New varieties were added by type foundries, including condensed, wide and contra-italic versions. Other display typefaces also proliferated following their lead; reverse-contrast typefaces, introduced by 1821, may be seen as an inversion of the style.

=== Ornamented designs ===
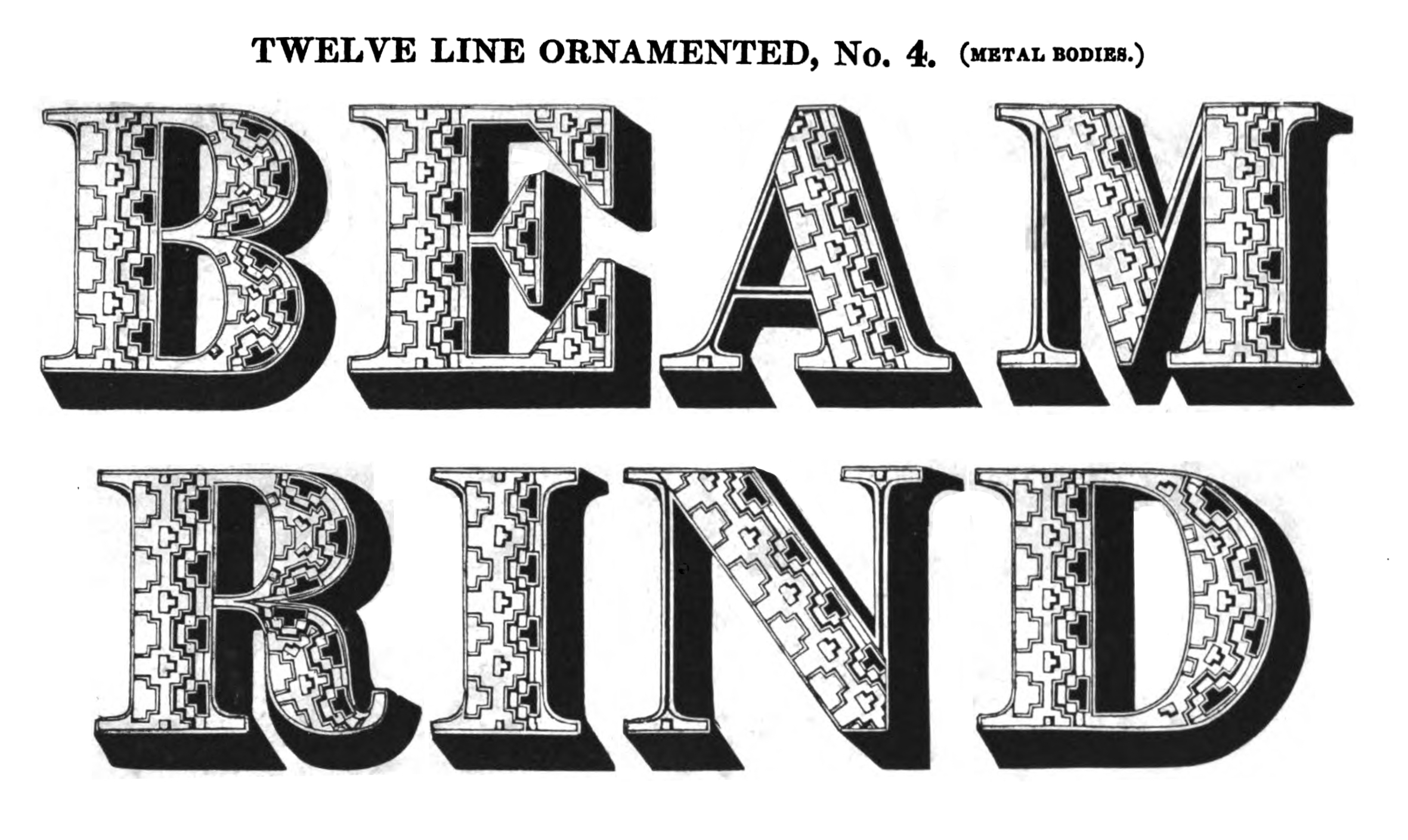

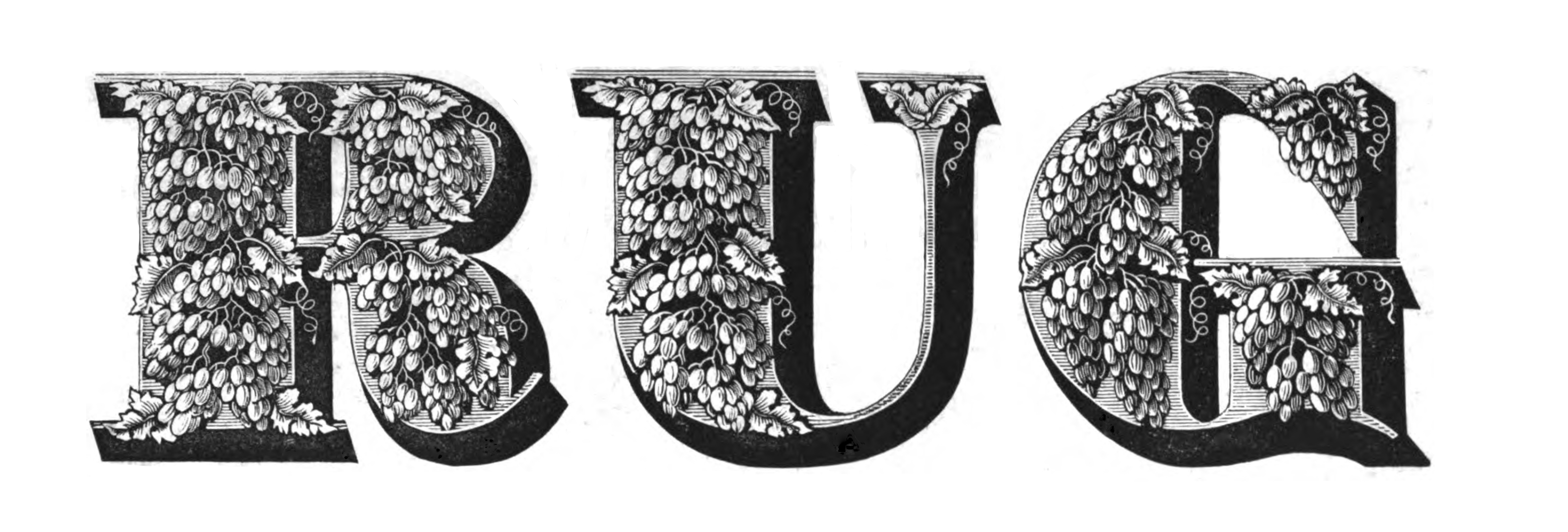
Two decorated types from the 1838 specimen book of the Austin Letter Foundry (Note: A very similar design to the first type was issued in the 1841 specimen of George F. Nesbitt, this time as chromatic multi-layer wood type with multiple types for multicoloured printing.)

Besides simple typefaces, variants were designed with patterns and decorations. These extended from simple inline designs to artwork such as flowers and harvest themes. Decorated fat face typefaces were cut in wood and reproduced by dabbing, or stereotype, a technique in which the wooden pattern is driven into molten metal just at the point of solidifying.

One type foundry particularly known for decorated designs was the London foundry of Louis John Pouchée, active from 1818 (Note: But possibly slightly earlier.) to 1830. Pouchée was a Freemason, and some of his foundry's types were inspired by Masonic emblems. Many of his wooden patterns are preserved. (Note: Some websites have assumed that Pouchée engraved these faces himself. This is unlikely to be correct as he was not an engraver but a businessman, he was the owner of a restaurant and then a coal merchant before he became a typefounder. The blocks do not have any engravers' names on them; Mosley assumes that they are the work of multiple engravers based on the mixture of styles and notes that a few similar hand-carved wooden types have come to light in England from other sources.) While very striking, it is not clear that these types were much used: John Dreyfus reported that "the late Ellic Howe, a printing historian and a Freemason, failed to discover any piece of printing on which Pouchée's Masonic types were used". He suggested that the fine detail of Pouchée's ornamented letters was not practical for job printing work at the time and that some of the designs were too large for playbills and handbills, their likely market. Ultimately large metal types were only briefly used, as they were soon replaced by routed and pantograph-engraved wood display type, which was much lighter and cheaper.

Bold lettering also appears on copperplate engraving, such as engraved maps of the period. Digital font designer Andy Clymer reports finding on engraved maps that it was more common for bold lettering to be decorated, leaving spaces not engraved out, than it was to be solid black: "whenever things would get heavier, they would often just get more ornamented…not filled in solid [but] with some kind of ornamentation or decoration." This is seen in A Specimen of the Print Hands, an internal specimen of lettering styles used by the Ordnance Survey in the early nineteenth century, in which the boldest lettering is decorated.

=== Late nineteenth century ===
New types of display type proliferated in the late nineteenth century. In 1863, printer H. Morgan in Madras wrote that fat-face letter "is seldom used now". In 1901 the influential American printer Theodore Low De Vinne criticised the style as "an object lesson of absurdity".

The term "fat face" continued to be used for bolder types, not just for the ultra-bold poster types. In 1893 William B. MacKellar of the major American type foundry MacKellar, Smiths, & Jordan showed a wide body text face described as a fat face in discussing pay scales for compositors.

== Twentieth century and later ==
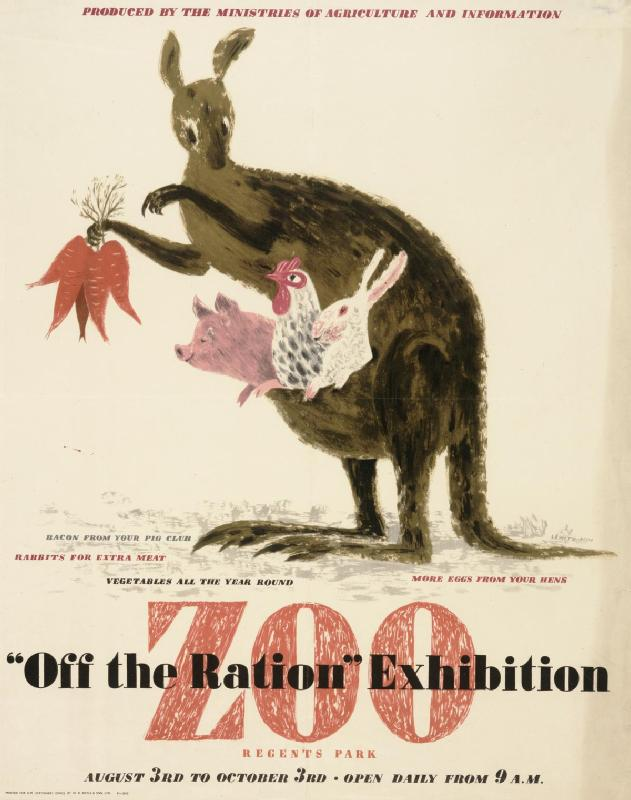
Mid-century poster by Lewitt-Him, an example of the revival of fat faces in graphic design around this time. The "f"s are "non-kerning", a style that only became popular from the middle of the nineteenth century.

Fat faces returned to some popularity in the twentieth century, in the UK as part of the Victoriana style promoted by John Betjeman and others in the 1930s. (Note: Name used for convenience: fat faces were introduced long before Victoria came to the throne in 1837; their presumed architect, Robert Thorne, died when she was less than a year old.) Fat face types sold as metal type in the twentieth century included:

- Ultra Bodoni by Morris Fuller Benton at American Type Founders.
- Falstaff by Monotype
- Normande by Berthold
- Thorowgood by Linotype.

Digital-period fat face types include:

- Elephant/Big Figgins by Matthew Carter (1992, in 1998 rereleased under the second name in an expanded family)
- Surveyor, designed by Hoefler & Frere-Jones, and later display companion Obsidian
- Brunel and Isambard by Paul Barnes with Christian Schwartz. (Although not a fat face, topping out in a bold weight, Barnes' Chiswick is inspired by vernacular letterforms preceding them, with a wide range of alternates based on lettering of the period.)
