= Quad (typography) =

Metal spacer used in letterpress typesetting

Comparison of quad sorts in letterpress typesetting. In yellow is the cast metal sort name, and in black the corresponding Unicode whitespace character name.

In typography, a quad (originally quadrat) was a metal spacer used in letterpress typesetting. The term was later adopted as the generic name for two common sizes of spaces in typography, regardless of the form of typesetting used. An em quad (originally m quadrat) is a space that is one em wide; as wide as the height of the font. An en quad (originally n quadrat) is a space that is one en wide: half the width of an em quad.

Both are encoded as characters in the General Punctuation code block of the Unicode character set as U+2000 EN QUAD and U+2001 EM QUAD, which are also defined to be canonically equivalent to U+2002 EN SPACE and U+2003 EM SPACE respectively.

LaTeX markup uses \quad for an em quad, and has other related whitespace escape sequences.

== History ==
In 1683, in Joseph Moxon's book on the art of printing, the terms m and n quadrat are attested:

And as there is three Heighths or Sizes to be considered in Letters Cut to the same Body, so is there three Sizes to be considered, with respect to the Thicknesses of all these Letters, when the Punches are to be Forged: For some are m thick; by m thick is meant m Quadrat thick, which is just so thick as the Body is high: Some are n thick; that is to say, n Quadrat thick, viz. half so thick as the Body is high: And some are Space thick; that is, one quarter so thick as the Body is high; though [...] we shall call these Spaces, Thick Spaces. (Note: A quarter of an m quadrat is known as middle space today. The term thick space was later commonly used for a third of an m quadrat.)

In 1771, in the first edition of the Encyclopædia Britannica, it says: (Note: This is worded very similarly to the Cyclopædia of 1728, page 926.)

Quadrat, in printing, a piece of metal cast like the letters, to fill up the void spaces between words, etc. There are quadrats of different sizes, as m-quadrats, n-quadrats, etc., which are, respectively, of the dimensions of these letters.

In 1841, in William Savage's A Dictionary of the Art of Printing, the terms em and en quadrat are attested:

QUADRATS. Pieces of type metal, of the depth of the body of the respective sizes to which they are cast, and lower than types, so as to leave a blank space on the paper, when printed, where they are placed: an en quadrat is half as thick as its depth; an em quadrat is equal in thickness and depth, and, being square on its surface, is the true quadrat, from quadratus, squared; a two em quadrat is twice the thickness of its depth; a three em three times; and a four em four times, as their names specify. Four ems are the largest quadrats that are cast. They are used to fill out short lines; to form white lines; and to justify letters, figures, &c., in any part of a line or page.

In 1903, in Chambers Dictionary, the term quad is attested:

Quad, kwod, n. (print.) an abbreviation of quadrat.—v.t. to fill with quadrats.
[...]
Quadrat, kwod′rat, n. a piece of type-metal lower than the letters, used in spacing between words and filling out blank lines (commonly Quad)—distinguished as en, em, two-em, and three-em.
