= Robert Besley =

English typographer and mayor (1794–1876)

Robert Besley (1794–1876) was an English typographer, creator of the Clarendon typeface in 1845, and the Lord Mayor of London in 1869.

== Career ==
Besley was born in Exeter on 14 October 1794 and began his business life in his father’s shop where, as an apprentice, he learned the skills of printing.

He married Eliza Courtney (born about 1797, died 20 September 1876) at St James Clerkenwell in 1821. Besley was taken into partnership by William Thorowgood at the Fann Street Foundry in Fann Street, City of London in 1838, having been employed as a traveller there since 1826. He worked with Thorowgood until the latter's retirement in 1849. Thorowgood had been the first to use the term "Grotesque" to describe a Sans-Serif typeface and the first to design one in lower case with Seven Line Grotesque.

When Besley created Clarendon in October 1845 he had it registered under the recently passed Ornamental Designs Act 1842, but the typeface became so popular that its rights were soon broken by people creating knock-offs, though Clarendon is still known as the first registered typeface.

He retired from the type-founding business in 1861.

Besley was elected to the City of London's Court of Common Council in 1854 to represent the Ward of Aldersgate where his business was based. In 1861 he was elected as Aldersgate's Alderman, a role he held until his death. Besley's Civic career progressed and he was elected as a Sheriff of the City of London in 1863 and Lord Mayor of London in 1869.

Besley also served as Chairman of the Scarborough and Whitby Railway Company and Chairman of Griffin’s Wharf as well as Governor of the Queen’s Anne Bounty, set up to support the incomes of poorer church clergy.

He died at Victoria Road, Wimbledon Park on 18 December 1876, and was buried at Battersea cemetery.

This drinking fountain was erected in 1878 in memory of 'Robert Besley Esq. Alderman of this ward and Lord Mayor of London, 1869 - 70'. The fountain was removed in 1934, but is memorialised by a Corporation of London Blue Plaque at 107 Aldersgate Street, London, EC1.

Besley is also mentioned on the Foundation Stone of the Guildhall Library and Museum in Basinghall Street, London, EC2.

Civic offices
Preceded by Sir James Lawrence	Lord Mayor of London; 1869–1870	Succeeded by Sir Thomas Dakin
