= NPS Rawlinson Roadway =

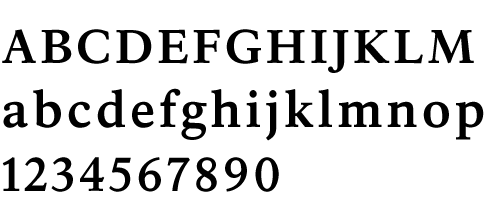
- Category: Serif
- Designer(s): James Montalbano
- Commissioned by: National Park Service
- Re-issuing foundries: Terminal Design
- Design based on: Plantin, Sabon, Garamond
- Also known as: NPS Rawlinson
- Website: www.terminaldesign.com
- Latest release version: 2.0

NPS Rawlinson Roadway is an old-style serif typeface currently used on the United States National Park Service's road signs. It was created in 2000 by Terminal Design to replace Clarendon. Type designer James Montalbano named the typeface after his wife's surname, as her father worked for the Forest Service.

Approximately 10–15% more compact than its predecessor, the typeface was found by the Pennsylvania Transportation Institute to increase readability by 11%.

Concurrent with NPS Rawlinson Roadway, the National Park Service uses Frutiger for applications requiring a sans-serif typeface.
