= James Savage (antiquary) =

British antiquary (1767–1845)

James Savage (1767–1845) was an English antiquary, who worked as printer, bookseller, librarian and newspaper editor.

== Life ==
Born at Howden, Yorkshire, on 30 August 1767, he was the son of James Savage, a bell and clock maker. When about sixteen years old he became a contributor to the journals published in the neighbourhood of Howden, and in 1790 he began business there with his brother, William Savage, as printer and bookseller.

In 1797 William Savage moved to London, and in 1803 James Savage followed him, at first employed in the publishing business of Sir Richard Phillips, and later by the firms of Joseph Mawman and William Sherwood. When the London Institution was founded in 1806 in the Old Jewry, Savage was appointed assistant librarian under Richard Porson, and he rescued Porson from the workhouse in St Martin's Lane on 20 September 1808, after a seizure not long before Porson's death.

After 1820 Savage spent some time in Taunton, first as manager of an unsuccessful Tory newspaper, then as a bookseller, and finally as librarian of the Somerset and Taunton Institution. His next move was to Dorchester, where he edited for fourteen years the Dorset County Chronicle and Somersetshire Gazette. He returned to Taunton, and died there on 19 March 1845.

== Works ==
In London Savage contributed to the Monthly Magazine and the Universal Magazine. He wrote:

- 'History of Howden Church' [anon.], 1799.
- 'History of the Castle and Parish of Wressle in the East Riding of Yorkshire,’ 1805.
- 'The Librarian,’ 1808–9; three volumes and one number (48 pp.) of the fourth volume. An 'Account of the Last Illness of Richard Porson' is in vol. i. pp. 274–81. It was also printed separately in an edition of seventy-five copies, and is embodied in John Selby Watson's Life of Porson, pp. 318–32.
- 'An Account of the London Daily Newspapers,’ 1811; describes their circulation and opinions at that date.
- 'Observations on the Varieties of Architecture,’ 1812.
- 'Memorabilia, or Recollections Historical, Biographical, and Antiquarian,’ 1820.
- 'A History of the Hundred of Carhampton, Somerset,’ 1830.
- 'Dorchester and its Environs,’ 1832, reissued in 1833.

He edited Concise History of the Present State of Commerce of Great Britain, translated [by J. W. H.] from the German of Charles Reinhard, 1805, and Joshua Toulmin's History of Taunton, 1822.

He projected works on Somerset which did not appear; the manuscripts which he collected for them were in the collections of Sir Thomas Phillipps, which were sold in June 1896.

== Family ==
His wife was Diana, eldest daughter of Thomas Swainston of Hatfield, near Doncaster. She died in 1806, and their son, Thomas James Savage, died on 15 May 1819, aged 21.
