= Robert Thorne (typographer) =

British type founder and typographer

Robert Thorne (1754 – 11 March 1820) was a British type founder and typographer. An apprentice to Thomas Cottrell, who had been an employee of William Caslon, Thorne later acquired Cottrell's type foundry. He was successful in business and left a fortune of £25,000 on his death in 1820. (Note: Source is Nicolete Gray (1977), but she does not list her source.) Thorne is buried at Holloway Road Cemetery, where his tomb is extant.

== Career ==
The beginning of Thorne's independent career is not certain; he was recorded as a typefounder in 1785, the year Cottrell died, but is only recorded as having purchased Cottrell's foundry in 1794. His first specimen appeared the same year. Thorne was based at first No. 6 and then No. 11 Barbican; in 1799 he was recorded as living at Church Street, Hackney. In 1802 he moved premises to a former brewery in Fann Street, Aldersgate, which became known as the Fann Street Foundry. He was recorded as a member of the London Society of Master Letter-Founders, a trade association and cartel, from 1809 onwards. (Note: The society minuted approaching him for membership in 1803 but may have been inoperative between then and 1809, when its minute book resumes recording meetings and Thorne is recorded as a member.) In 1817-8 Thorne considered retiring (according to Talbot Baines Reed, whose family later took over his company, he was in poor health), and offered his business for sale for £8,000 but could not find a buyer. On his death the business was auctioned as a single concern, (Note: According to Reed's auction catalogue, on 21 June 1820 at Garraway's Coffee House, with the auction beginning at 12pm.) and bought by William Thorowgood, the co-proprietor of a pump company (according to Reed "with the proceeds, it is said, of a fortunate draw in one of the State Lotteries").

Contemporary sources credit Thorne with introducing the fat face display typefaces that came to dominate poster design from around 1810 onwards, although a lack of typeface specimen books from the period, both from Thorne and from his competitors, make this hard to confirm. According to Thomas Curson Hansard (1825), "the extremely bold and fat letter, now prevalent in job-printing, owes its introduction principally to Mr. Thorne, a spirited and successful letter-founder" and according to William Savage (1822) he "has been principally instrumental in the revolution that has taken place in Posting Bills by the introduction of fat types." Reed wrote that his early types shown in 1798 formed a specimen that is "indeed one of the most elegant of which that famous decade can boast. For lightness, grace and uniformity [it] excels that of almost all his competitors" but that his later typefaces were "exceedingly thick and fat". No full specimen of Thorne's survives for the last decade of his career, although in Reed's view Thorowgood's of 1821 "may be taken as representing the contents of the foundry pretty much as Thorne left it" with some additions; Reed published a summary of a sale catalogue, since lost.

In the early twentieth century several writers on printing enthusiastically rated Thorne as the villain who ruined the art of printing in England: Daniel Berkeley Updike wrote that his 1803 specimen showcased "the vilest form of type invented–up to that time" and it "should be looked at as a warning of what fashion can make men do" and Stanley Morison that he "all but sent printing to perdition at one stroke". More recent writers, such as Nicolete Gray and Paul Barnes, have simultaneously been more complimentary towards his work and cautioned that limited documentation means that his supposed impact on printing trends cannot be confirmed.
