= Louis Pouchée =

Louis John Pouchée (1782 – 15 March 1845), was a London type founder and entrepreneur.

== Career ==
Pouchée is first recorded as the proprietor of Alamode Beef and Veal House (1811–1812) and Pouchée & Co Coal Merchants (1811–22), both in Holborn, but it was in 1818 that Pouchée established his type foundry in Lincoln's Inn Fields. He imported Henri Didot's mechanical typefounding machine, the machine polyamatype, in 1823 which could cast 200 types at once and repeat the process two or three times a minute. Pouchée also paid Didot 48,000 Francs for the patent rights of a planing and cross-cutting machine. Pouchée soon became a major manufacturer of pictorial stock-blocks and printers' ornaments. Type from Pouchée's foundry was used to print the Evening Times newspaper.

Pouchée recruited skilled staff and paid high wages, but sold his type more cheaply than other foundries. He was forced out of business in 1830 by the other typefounders, whose prices he undercut. Pouchée sold his typecasting machine to Mr Reed, Covent Garden printer, for £100, however Reed was frontman for a syndicate of type founders, who arranged to have the machine taken out to sea and dumped over board.

By 1831 he was Assessor of Stagecoach Duties for the cities of London, Westminster and County of Middlesex.

== The discovery and reproduction of Pouchée's Alphabets ==
Some 23 of Pouchée's decorated alphabets have survived and are now held at the St Bride Library. They were discovered at the sale of the Caslon Type Foundry in 1937, at that time identified simply as "Victorian" curiosities; and after spending the World War II in a store in London were transferred for a time to Oxford University Press. It wasn't until 1966 that they were identified, by St Bride Librarian James Mosley, as being from the foundry of L. J. Pouchée. This finding was afterwards corroborated by the discovery of a type catalogue, Specimens of Stereotype Casting, from the Foundry of L J Pouchée.

These original wooden blocks were printed as reproduction sets of type specimen sheets by Ian Mortimer using Albion iron hand presses for the unbound folio Ornamented Types. Published by I. M. Imprimit and St Bride Library, 200 sets were produced over a period of two and a half years.

Characters from one of Pouchée's alphabets are used on the cover artwork for the Pulp album We Love Life, designed by Peter Saville. Another of Pouchée's alphabets was used by the street artist Ben Eine to cover shop shutters in London's East End.

== Description of the alphabets ==
Working with the most richly ornamented letters ever to have been made for letterpress printing, Pouchée's staff created fat-face style letters featuring flowers, fruit, animals, agricultural implements, musical instruments and Masonic symbols. Up to 26 lines in cap height and made from single blocks of end-grain boxwood, they were intended as eye-catching elements for printed posters. They were described in one of the extra scenes of the documentary film Typeface as the most ambitious and most beautiful types created in wood in any period.

== Family and personal life ==
Louis John Pouchée was the eldest son of Louis and Mary (née Pickering). His father, a Rouen-born violinist with the Covent Garden Orchestra who died at the age of 108, became known in London society for his longevity, with portraits painted by both Thomas Charles Wageman and by Emma Soyer.

Louis John was baptised on 1 December 1782 at Gressenhall, Norfolk, England. His siblings included Edward Dixon Pouchée, publisher of periodicals such as News of Literature and Fashion, The English Gentleman, and The European Review. In 1805 Louis John Pouchée married Elizabeth Howard, sister of the typefounder William Howard of the Chiswick Press. They had two children, George John and Elizabeth Mary.

Pouchée was a Freemason (he was initiated into the Egyptian Lodge in October 1811) and owned hare coursing greyhounds. He was also a contributing member of the Society for the Encouragement of Arts, Manufactures and Commerce. Little is known about the later years of Pouchée's life although he is recorded as being in Paris during the July Revolution; giving money to the widow of a workman who had taken up arms with his employer, an English printer.

He was buried at Brompton Cemetery.
