= Fann Street Foundry =

Coordinates: 51.522°N 0.0969°W

Charles Reed's office at 33 Aldersgate Street

The Fann Street Foundry was a type foundry (a company that designs or distributes typefaces) located on Fann Street, City of London.

== Establishment ==
In 1794, Robert Thorne (1754-1820) acquired the type foundry of the late Thomas Cottrell based in Nevil's Court, and moved it to 11 Barbican, and then in 1802 to a former brewery in Fann Street, and renamed it the Fann Street Foundry. On his death in 1820, the business was bought by William Thorowgood with the help of money he had won in a lottery. Thorowgood was the first to use the term "Grotesque" to describe a Sans-Serif typeface and to design one in lowercase with his Seven Line Grotesque.

== Nineteenth-century heyday ==
In 1838, the typographer Robert Besley was taken into partnership by William Thorowgood at the Fann Street Foundry. He created Clarendon in 1845, the first typeface registered under the Ornamental Designs Act 1842, and retired from the business in 1861, becoming Lord Mayor of London in 1869.

In 1842, Charles Reed co-founded the firm of Tyler & Reed, printers and typefounders. He became a partner in the Fann Street Foundry in 1861 (which after that became known as Reed & Fox). The Fann Street business formed the basis for his own typefounding business, Sir Charles Reed & Sons, which had an office at 33 Aldersgate Street.

In 1881, following his father's death, the author and typefounder, Talbot Baines Reed, became head of the Fann Street Foundry. By then, he had begun his monumental History of the Old English Letter Foundries, published in 1887, which was hailed as the standard work on the subject. Talbot Baines Reed died in 1893, aged only 41.

== Gallery ==
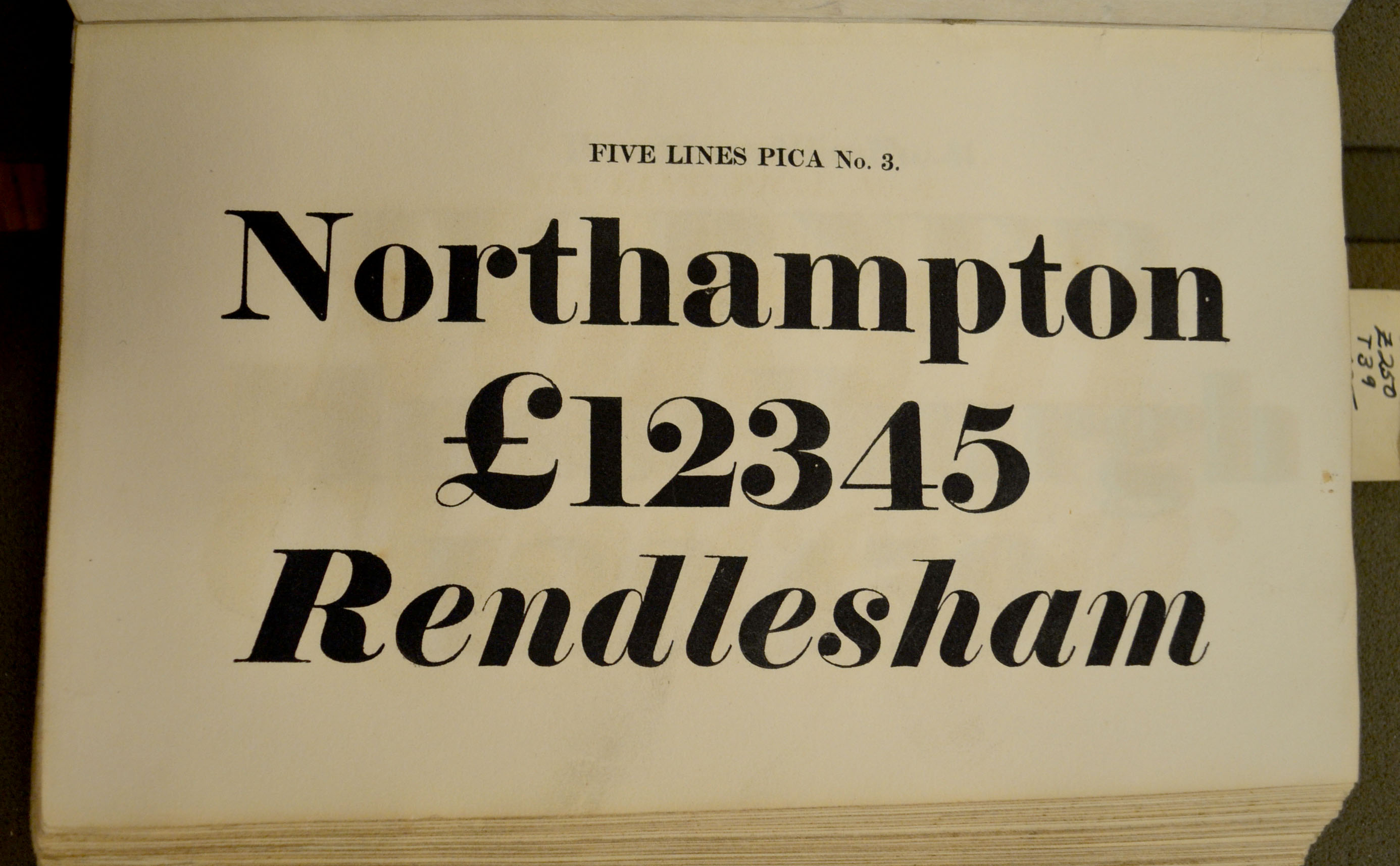
Fat face type in an 1825 specimen book.

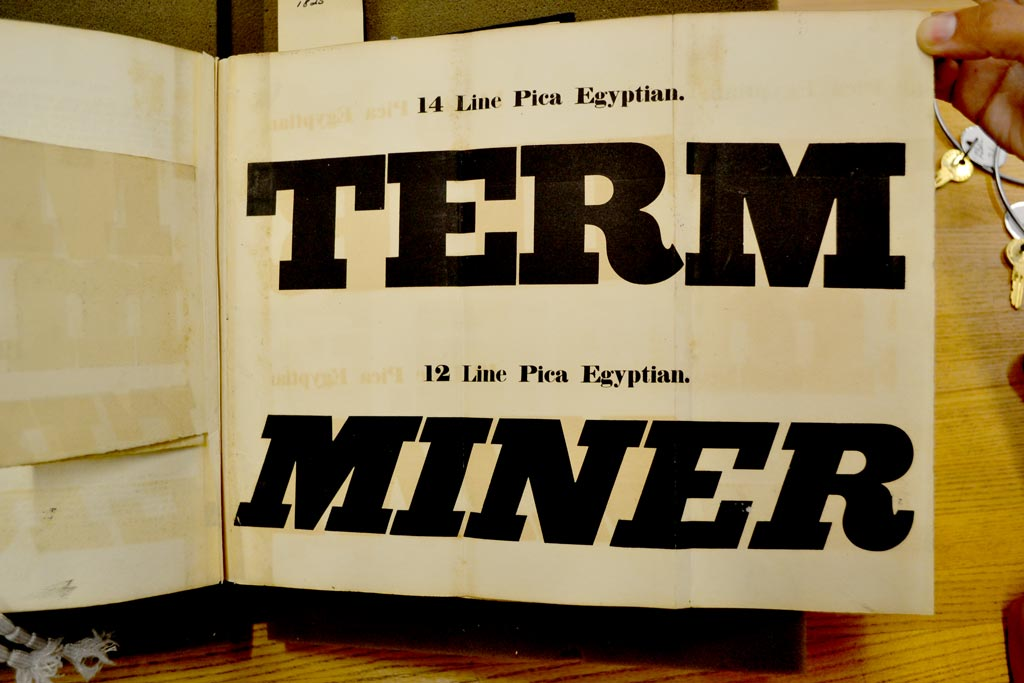
Slab serif capitals

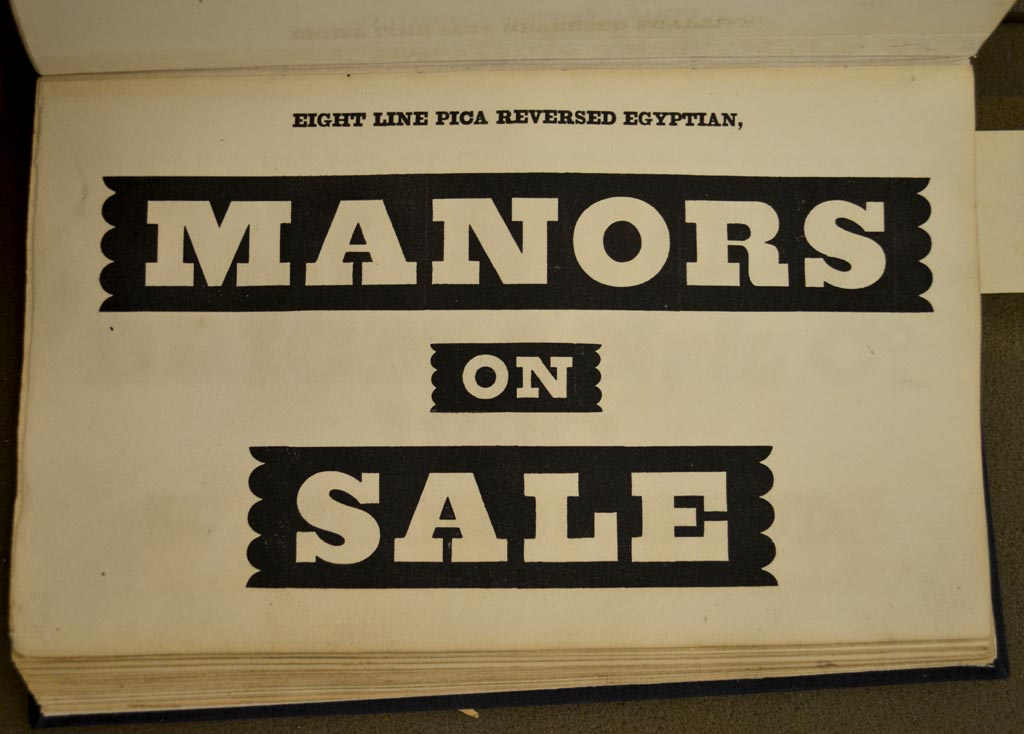
Reversed or "streamer" slab serif capitals

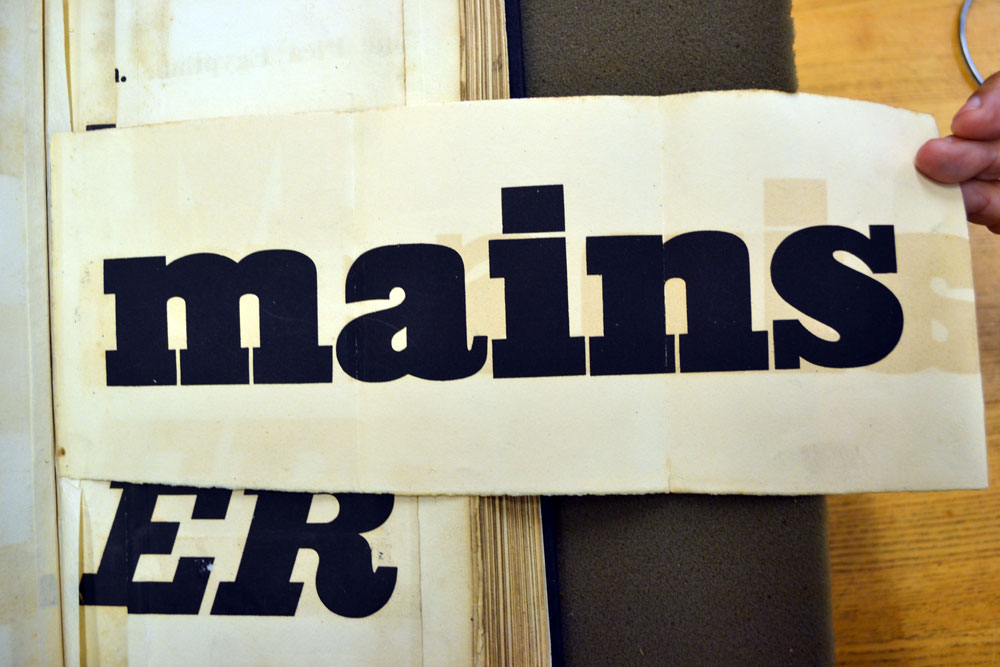
Slab serif lower-case

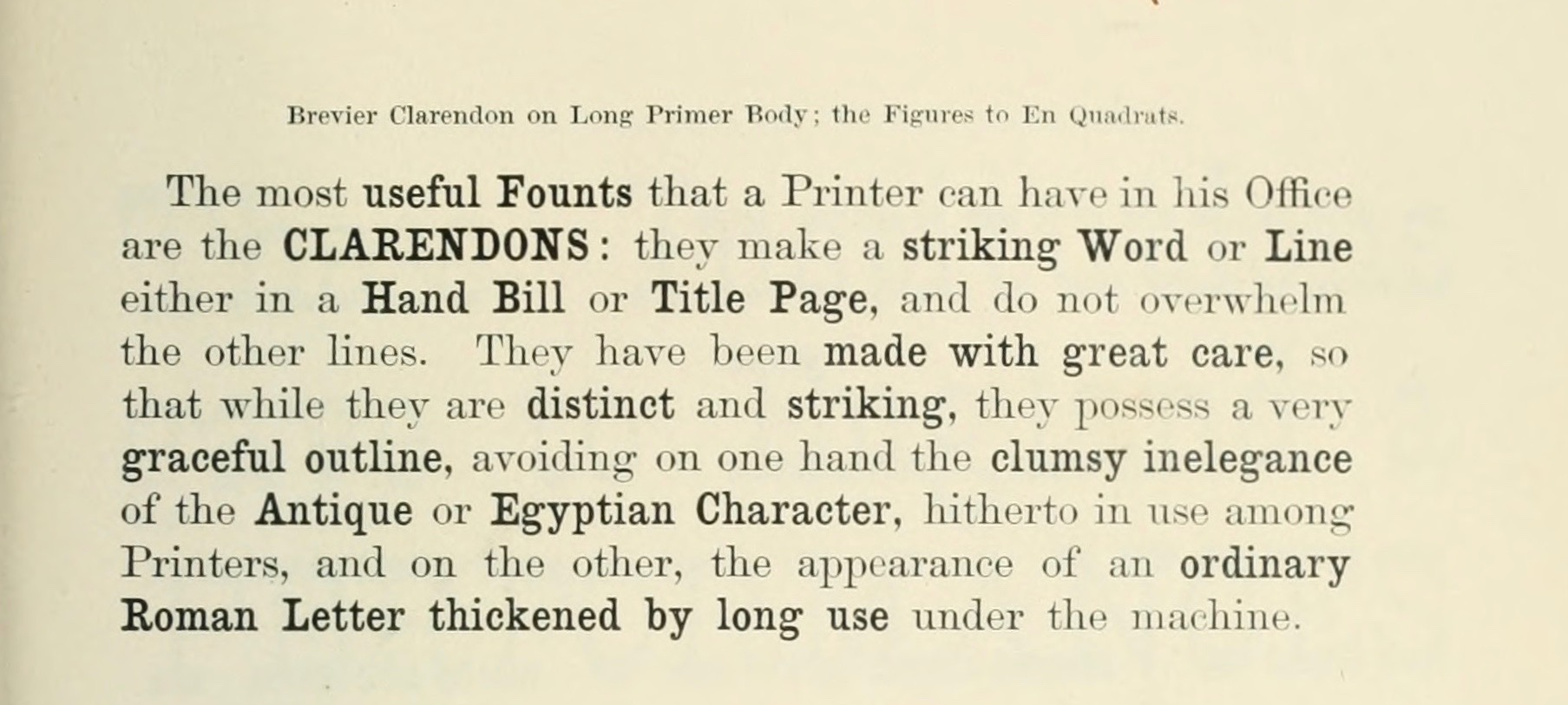
The first Clarendon type, in a c. 1874 specimen

== Closure ==
Fann Street Foundry closed in 1906, after which its designs passed to the Sheffield-based Stephenson Blake. Founded in 1818, Stephenson Blake was the last active type foundry in the UK at its closure in 2005.
