= William Thorowgood =

British typographer and type founder

William Thorowgood (died 1877) was a British typographer and type founder.

On the death of its founder Robert Thorne in 1820, Thorowgood bought the Fann Street Foundry.

He was active in the development of Sans Serif.
