= William Savage (printer) =

English printer & engraver (1770–1843)

William Savage (1770–1843) was an English printer, engraver, draughtsman and author of several works about printing.

== Life ==
Born in 1770 at Howden in the East Riding of Yorkshire, he was the younger son of James Savage, a clockmaker. He was educated at the church school in Howden. In 1790 he went into business as a printer and bookseller there in partnership with his elder brother, James Savage. In 1797 he moved to London, and about two years later was appointed printer to the Royal Institution. There for ten years he was assistant secretary to the board of managers, and also secretary to the library committee, secretary to the committee of chemistry, and superintendent of the printing office.

About 1803 Savage went also into business as a printer in London on his own account. In 1807 he was commissioned to print Edward Forster's British Gallery of Engravings, It made his reputation as printer.

Savage died at his residence at Dodington Grove, Kensington, on 25 July 1843, leaving three daughters.

== Works ==
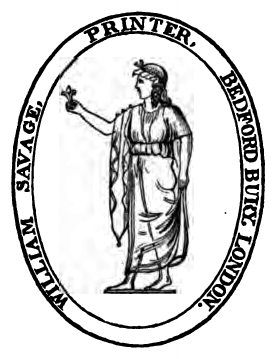
William Savage, printer's mark

Savage devised a printing ink without any oil in its composition, and publicised it in Preparations in Printing Ink in various Colours (London, 1832). In recognition of his services, the Society for the Encouragement of Arts awarded him their large medal and a sum of money "for his imitations of drawings, printed from engravings on wood, with inks of his own preparing".

Savage published Dictionary of the Art of Printing (London, 1840–1, in 16 numbers); it drew on the work of Joseph Moxon. He was also the author of:

- Observations on Emigration to the United States, London, 1819.
- Practical Thoughts on Decorative Printing, London, 1822 (limited edition). This work was illustrated by engravings from Augustus Wall Callcott, John Varley, John Thurston, Thomas Willement, and William Henry Brooke. The edition was limited.

Savage was a draughtsman, and there are engravings from drawings by him in the section of John Britton's Beauties of England and Wales dealing with Yorkshire.

== Sources ==
- Savage, William (1822). Practical hints on decorative printing. London : For the proprietor by Messrs. Longman, Hurst, Ress, Orme, and Brown, T. Cadell, J. Booth, J. Major, R. Triphook, and R. Jennings.
