= List of typefaces designed by Tobias Frere-Jones =

The following is a list of typefaces designed by Tobias Frere-Jones.

== For FontFont ==
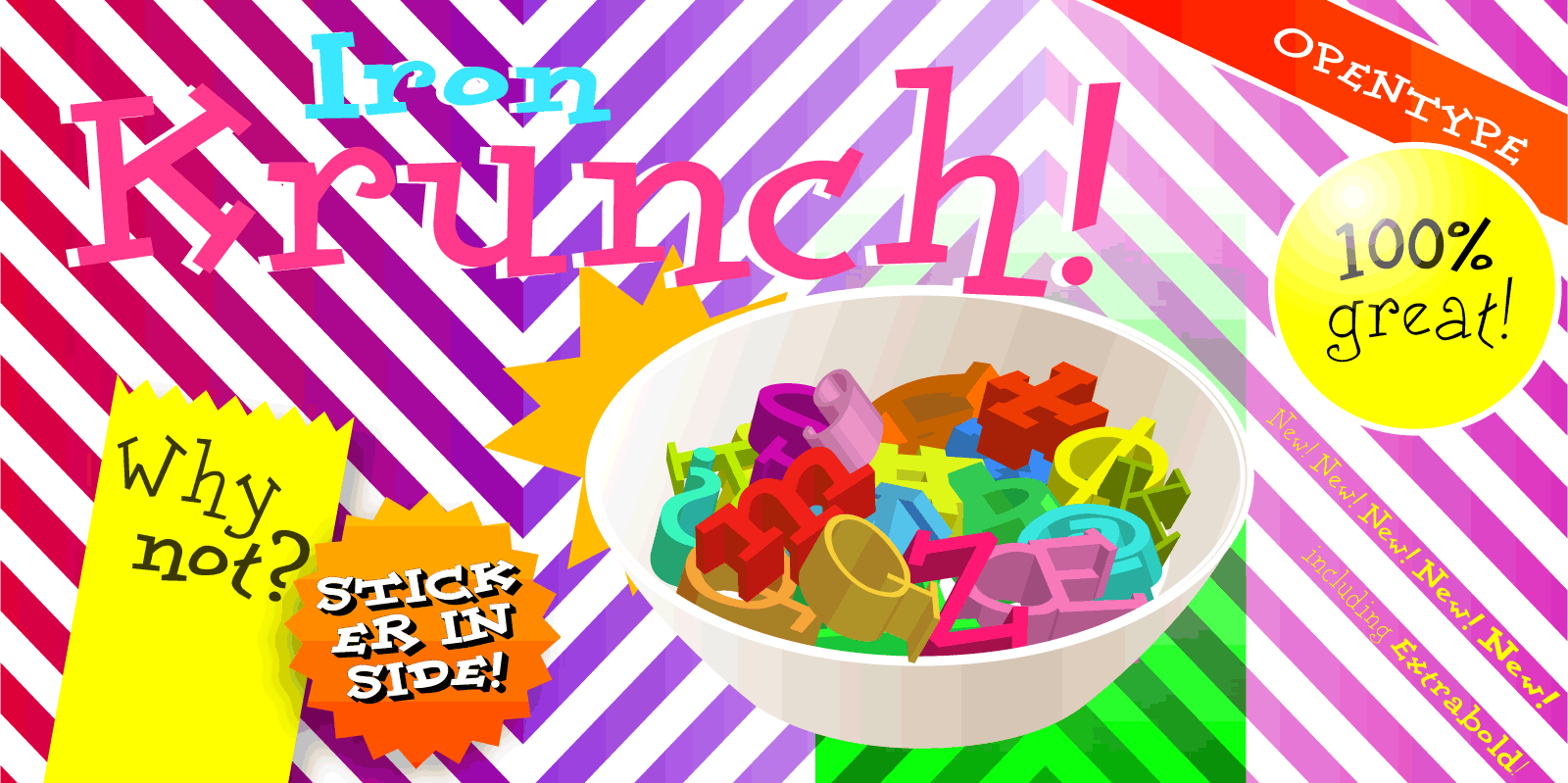
A FontShop specimen for FF Dolores

- Dolores (1991) - casual slab serif. Originated as a logo for his brother's band.

== For Fuse ==
- Reactor (1993)
- Fibonacci (1994)
- Microphone (1995)

== For Font Bureau ==
- Armada (1987–94) - geometric sans-serif, similar to gaspipe lettering. Project begun in high school.
- Hightower Text (1990–94) - a "Venetian" old-style serif inspired by the work of Nicolas Jenson. Initially used by the journal of AIGA.
- Nobel (1991–93) revival of the Lettergieterij Amsterdam geometric sans-serif. This was developed by Sjoerd Hendrik de Roos and Dick Dooijes by taking the Berthold foundry's Berthold-Grotesk and altering some characters. One of several revivals of this design; another exists by the Dutch Type Library. Used by Ineos.
- Garage Gothic (1992) - somewhat distressed, blocky sans-serif with rounded corners, inspired by parking ticket receipts.
- Archipelago (1992)
- Cafeteria (1993) - casual sans-serif similar to hand lettering.
- Epitaph (1993) - decorative sans-serif inspired by an Art Nouveau typeface issued by American Type Founders.
- Reiner Script (1993) - script font.
- Stereo (1993) - relief sans serif.

A digitisation of Eldorado by Font Bureau, on which Frere-Jones collaborated (shown is the Text optical size).

- Eldorado (1993–94) - revival of Dwiggins' Eldorado (1953), itself based on a 16th-century font by Jacques de Sanlecque the Elder. Designed with David Berlow, Tom Rickner and Jane Patterson.
- Reactor (1993–96) - distressed sans-serif, an example of the “grunge typography” style of the 1990s. Created for Neville Brody's Fuse magazine, one of several drawn by Frere-Jones that appeared in Fuse in this period.
- Interstate (1993–2004) - inspired by the Highway Gothic series of alphabets for the FHWA. Several italic styles were designed by Cyrus Highsmith, and the monospaced versions were designed by Christian Schwartz.
- Niagara (1994) - Art Deco-influenced display typeface with minimal serifs, similar to Onyx or a lighter version of City. With an inline style.
- Asphalt (1995) - bulging casual sans-serif, somewhat similar to Antique Olive Nord and Ad Lib.
- Benton Gothic (1995–97) - grotesque sans-serif loosely inspired by sans-serif typefaces designed by Morris Fuller Benton of American Type Founders, especially News Gothic. First commissioned by Martha Stewart Living magazine, with additional styles commissioned by Worth magazine. Later replaced by Benton Sans by Cyrus Highsmith.
- Citadel (1995) - Art Deco-influenced slab serif, similar to City but with an inline style.
- Pilsner (1995) - blocky sans-serif, inspired by a beer label.
- Estupido-Espezial (1995) - joke redesign of OCR-A with swashes and a long s Used for a "technology" section of Rolling Stone.
- Benton Modern (1997–2001) - revival of the Century type family, a large Didone body text family by Morris Fuller Benton of American Type Founders. Originally for the Boston Globe. Some styles drawn by Christian Schwartz and others by Richard Lipton.
- Poynter Old Style (1997–2000) - inspired by the high-contrast, slightly condensed old-style serifs of the Low Countries, in particular those designed by Hendrik van den Keere. Text and display optical sizes. Some display styles drawn by Cyrus Highsmith.
- Poynter Gothic (1997–99) - grotesque sans-serif loosely inspired by sans-serif typefaces designed by Morris Fuller Benton of American Type Founders, including News Gothic and Franklin Gothic. Intended to harmonise with Poynter Oldstyle.
- Griffith Gothic (1997–2000) - revival of Bell Gothic by Chauncey H. Griffith, intended for display sizes.
- Phemister (1997)
- Grand Central (1998–2000) - wedge-serif “Latin” capital alphabet, inspired by a Beaux Arts alphabet used for signs at Grand Central Terminal, New York.

== Hoefler & Frere-Jones ==
Three of Frere-Jones' best-known typefaces were designed for Martha Stewart Living magazine, Surveyor, Archer and MSL Gothic, later released as Benton Sans.

- Whitney (1996–2004) humanist sans-serif. Originally created for the Whitney Museum of American Art in New York.
- Nitro (2001–14)
- Gotham (2000–09) wide geometric-influenced sans-serif, inspired by architectural lettering on inter- and post-war buildings in New York. Similarities to Proxima, Avenir and Nobel. Designed with Jesse Ragan and commissioned by GQ; famously used by the Obama presidential campaigns. Very large range of styles released, including a rounded version.
- Surveyor (2001–14) Didone serif design inspired by engraved maps with optical sizes. Commissioned by Martha Stewart Living magazine along with Archer.
- Idlewild (2002–12) - wide, all-caps alphabet
- Tungsten (2004–12)
- Gotham Rounded (2005)

Collaborations with Jonathan Hoefler:

- Numbers (1997–2006)
- Mercury Text (1999)
- Vitesse (2000)
- Landmark (2000–12)
- Evolution (2000)
- Archer (2001–08) - slab serif with ball terminals. Originally commissioned by Martha Stewart Living magazine along with Surveyor.

== Frere-Jones Type ==
- Mallory (2015) - Sans-serif with 1920s and 30s influences. Released with a “micro-plus” optical size intended for small-print use, with wider spacing. Similarities to Dwiggins’ Metro and Gill Sans.
- Retina (2000–16) - a small-size sans-serif for the Wall Street Journal.
- Exchange (2007–17) - text-size serif created for the Wall Street Journal.
- Conductor (2016–18) - a display family inspired by Bulgarian lottery tickets, designed with Nina Stössinger.
- Empirica (1994–2018) - display serif inspired by Roman square capitals and French "old-style" or "Elzevir" typefaces of the nineteenth century, designed with Nina Stössinger.
- Seaford (2019–21) - sans-serif for Microsoft, with Nina Stössinger and Fred Shallcrass
- Community Gothic (1997–2022) - collection of rough-hewn gothics in a nineteenth century style, designed with Fred Shallcrass and Nina Stössinger.
- Supermassive (2019–2024) - heavy all-caps family for large sizes, designed with Fred Shallcrass, Nina Stössinger, and Rosie Mai.
- Edgar (2014–2025) - oldstyle text-size serif, designed with Nina Stössinger, Hrvoje Živčić, and Fred Shallcrass.
