= Frere-Jones =

Frere-Jones is a surname. Notable people with the surname include:

- Sasha Frere-Jones (born 1967), American writer and musician
- Tobias Frere-Jones (born 1970), American type designer, brother of Sasha
