= Retina (typeface) =

Font for use in small sizes

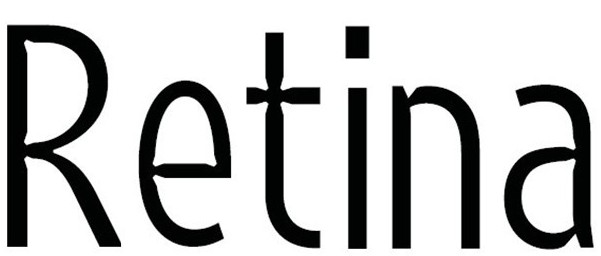
- Category: Sans-serif
- Designer(s): Tobias Frere-Jones
- Commissioned by: The Wall Street Journal
- Foundry: Hoefler & Frere-Jones
- Date created: 1999
- Date released: 2000
- Re-issuing foundries: Digital
- License: Proprietary
- Trademark: Frere-Jones Type
- Website: frerejones.com/families/retina

Retina is a font by created by Tobias Frere-Jones for The Wall Street Journal, which used it for high density print in their newspapers from 2000 to 2007. It was created to be legible at very small font sizes, using ink traps to stop smearing during the printing process.

== History ==
In 1999 Jonathan Hoefler and Tobias Frere-Jones's firm Hoefler & Frere-Jones was commissioned to create a font for The Wall Street Journal stock listings. The font was completed and began use in The Wall Street Journal stock listings in 2000.

The small size of Retina allowed The Wall Street Journal to print the same amount of text on eight fewer pages per issue, which was estimated to have saved the newspaper $6 million to $7 million annually. The Wall Street Journal condensed the size of its pages in 2007, replacing Retina with another font that was also developed by Hoefler & Frere-Jones called Exchange.

In 2011 Retina was one of twenty-three digital fonts acquired by MoMA for its Architecture and Design collection after being gifted to the museum by Hoefler & Frere-Jones, and the font is now used by many newspapers for high density texts such as stock information and classified ads.

Retina was released for licence to the public in 2016.

== Design ==
Retina was originally created specifically to be used at 5.5 point on newspaper. The resulting font is designed to be best used at 7 point or below. Unlike a monospaced font, each letter has a unique width, but each character maintains its original width regardless of weight – meaning a bold letter will take up the same width as an italic letter or a regular letter.

Retina is a sans-serif font designed for high-density texts and comes in a microplus and standard version. The microplus is meant for extremely small font, whereas the standard version is meant for larger point where the notches on the microplus version would be too visible.

The notches in the microplus version are ink traps, designed to serve as wells for excess ink to pool into during the printing process to avoid smudging the tiny lettering.

The font shares some features with old-style serif fonts such as Garamond and Janson.
