= Futura (typeface) =

Geometric sans-serif typeface

- Category: Sans-serif
- Classification: Geometric
- Designer: Paul Renner
- Foundry: Bauersche Gießerei
- Date created: 1927; 99 years ago
- Re-issuing foundries: Intertype; Linotype; Bitstream Inc.; URW; Elsner+Flake; The Foundry; Monotype
- Variations: Futura Condensed; Futura Inline; Architype Renner; Formera; Futura Now
- Shown here: Futura LT

Futura is a geometric sans-serif typeface designed by Paul Renner and released in 1927. Designed as a contribution on the New Frankfurt-project, it is based on geometric shapes, especially the circle, similar in spirit to the Bauhaus design style of the period. It was developed as a typeface by Bauersche Gießerei, in competition with Ludwig & Mayer's seminal Erbar typeface.

Although Renner was not associated with the Bauhaus, he shared many of its idioms and believed that a modern typeface should express modern models, rather than be a revival of a previous design. Renner's design rejected the approach of most previous sans-serif designs (now often called grotesques), which were based on the models of sign painting, condensed lettering, and nineteenth-century serif typefaces, in favour of simple geometric forms: near-perfect circles, triangles and squares. It is based on strokes of near-even weight, which are low in contrast. The lowercase has tall ascenders, which rise above the cap line, and uses nearly-circular, single-storey forms for the "a" and "g", the former previously more common in handwriting than in printed text. (Note: It was, though, not the first sans-serif with these features: Koralle, for instance, already used a single-storey 'a', and the form is standard in blackletter.) The uppercase characters present proportions similar to those of classical Roman capitals. The original metal type showed extensive adaptation of the design to individual sizes, and several divergent digitisations have been released by different companies.

Futura was extensively marketed by Bauersche Gießerei and its American distribution arm by brochure as capturing the spirit of modernity, using the German slogan "die Schrift unserer Zeit" ["the typeface of our time"] and in English "the typeface of today and tomorrow". It has remained popular since then.

== Release ==
Original drafts of Futura had more abstract variant designs for several letters, such as a two-storey lowercase "a" (left, compared to Futura's standard one-storey "a" at right).

Renner began sketching his letters that would become Futura in 1924; the typeface was available for use three years later. Matrices for machine composition were made by Intertype.

Futura was developed as a contribution to the New Frankfurt project, a radical affordable housing project in Frankfurt, Germany that many renowned modernist architects at the time were involved in. Described as "the typeface of our time" and "a face representing the new typography of the European avant-garde", Futura was released to stand out against the sans-serif and more elaborate, handwritten-style typefaces that were popular at the time in order to promote simplicity, modernism and industrialization.

== Design ==
Despite its clean geometric appearance, some of Futura's design choices recalled classic serif typefaces. Unlike many sans-serif designs intended for display purposes, Futura has quite a low x-height, reducing its stridency and increasing its suitability for body text. (Note: This characteristic did vary by size: unlike digital facsimiles, Futura in metal type was made differently at different sizes.)

The design of Futura avoids the decorative, eliminating nonessential elements, but makes subtle departures from pure geometric designs that allow the letterforms to seem balanced. This is visible in the apparently almost perfectly round stroke of the o, which is nonetheless slightly ovoid, and in how the circular strokes of letters like b gently thin as they merge with the verticals. Renner's biographer Christopher Burke has noted the important role of the Bauer's manufacturing team in adapting the design for different sizes of text, a feature not seen in digital releases. However, Renner expressed some disappointment with the slow design and release process, as it allowed Erbar (1926) to precede his design and other typefaces of similar design to appear in the same year as its release.

Renner's original plan was for two versions: a more conventional version suitable for general use, and a more eccentric, geometric lower case based on the circle and triangle. This plan was scrapped, although the characters did appear on an early specimen and more recently on at least one digitisation.

Futura was immediately very successful, and was heavily marketed as embodying the spirit of modernity. Other foundries quickly launched derivative geometric sans-serif typefaces, particularly in the United States. In the UK Futura, while sometimes used, was overshadowed by Gill Sans, which became popular for similar reasons in the UK and came to define 1930s and 1940s printing. While more humanist, it also has geometric leanings which are particularly visible in the capitals.

At a time when Hitler and Nazi Germany ideologies were on the rise, typefaces were a strong indicator of culture and national identity. Roman typefaces were rising in popularity, and they were becoming the standard text for printed documents where Blackletter typefaces had been the default style. As a way to hold on to German identity, many German nationalists promoted Blackletter typefaces over Roman. When the Nazi regime rose into power in 1933, they used Blackletter typefaces, such as Fraktur and Tannenberg, to advance German national identity. They rejected modern type styles like Futura, which went on to become popular throughout the world, influenced by the Bauhaus and the English Arts and Crafts Movements. Even so, Futura made appearances on Nazi documentation, such as the Organisationsbuch der NSDAP, an informational handbook about membership to the Nazi Party and on posters promoting Entartete Kunst [Degenerate Art], the exhibition that was created by the Nazis to denounce modern art. In 1941, in his "Normal type" decree, Nazi party chief Martin Bormann changed the policy in favour of Antiqua, a Roman typeface. This and other Roman faces, which included Futura, became the new standard due to its superior legibility over blackletter typography.

Design historian Dan Reynolds notes that its slogan "the typeface of today" was not the first time Bauer had used that slogan: it had previously been used to market Wieynck-Kursiv (also known as Wienyk-Kursiv), a florid script typeface by Heinrich Wieynck that never became very popular, around 1914: "Nobody has ever described Wieynk-Kursiv that way since then, as the claim was simply not accurate, just aspirational. I think the company had a marketing slogan in its back pocket, which it hoped would eventually stick. With Futura, it finally did".

== Usage ==
Futura remains an important typeface family and continues to be used for both a headline and body content.

Beginning in the late 1970s, Futura was also the iconic typeface used by American Conceptual artist Barbara Kruger. She layers white text, set in Futura Bold Oblique, on a red background against black and white found photography from mass media sources. Her text challenges the viewer to reflect on gender, stereotypes and consumerism. Some of her notable works where Futura is featured are "Untitled (Your body is a battleground)", "You Are Not Yourself" and "I shop, Therefore I Am".

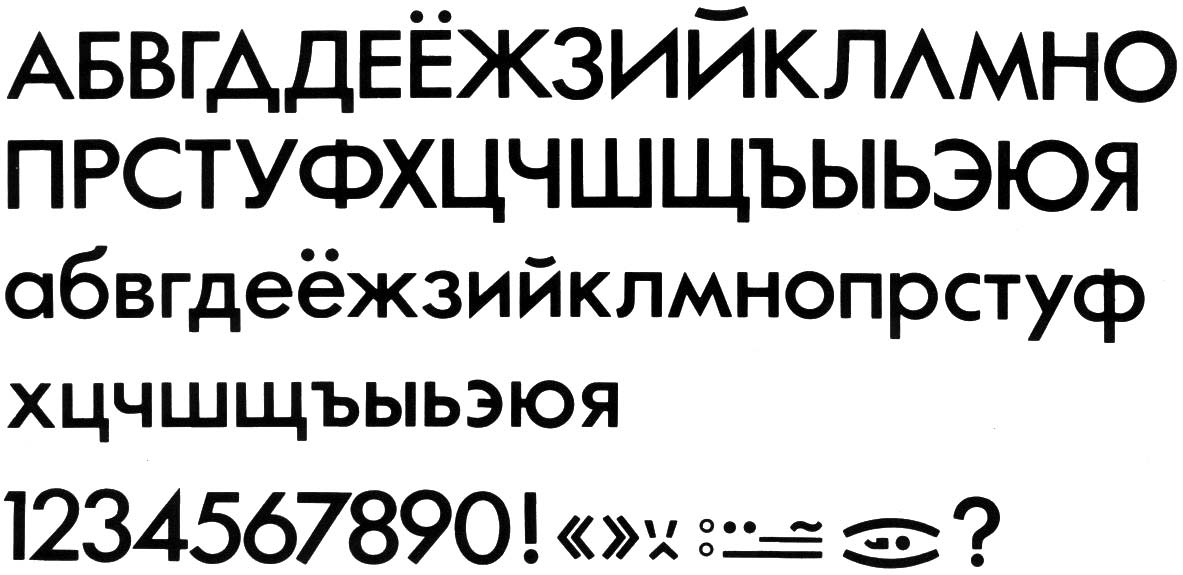
Cyrillic variant of the Futura typeface made for the Summer Olympic Games Moscow 1980.

A Cyrillic variant of the Futura Medium typography was made by Anatoli Muzanov for the 1980 Summer Olympics held in Moscow.

Some filmmakers used Futura frequently in their films. Gaspar Noé uses Futura in almost all his films. Futura was used in the early films of Wes Anderson, including in the titles of Bottle Rocket, Rushmore (film), and Fantastic Mr. Fox (film) and extensive use in the prop design and titles in The Royal Tennenbaums. Title designer Maurice Binder also used Futura in the title sequence for the 1971 James Bond film Diamonds Are Forever.

Crockett Johnson used Futura for the lettering of his Barnaby comic strip, which started running in April 1942 in the newspaper PM. Where many cartoonists lettered their dialogues by hand, Johnson collaborated with the PM typesetters who would set his dialogues in italicized Futura medium and return them to him so that they could be integrated to his drawings.

== Later metal type versions ==
=== Futura Condensed ===
Futura Condensed is a condensed version of the original Futura font family. Bold and bold oblique fonts were released in 1930. Medium, medium oblique, extra bold, and extra bold oblique fonts were released in 1936. Light and light oblique fonts were released in 1950.

=== Futura Display (Futura Schlagzeile) ===
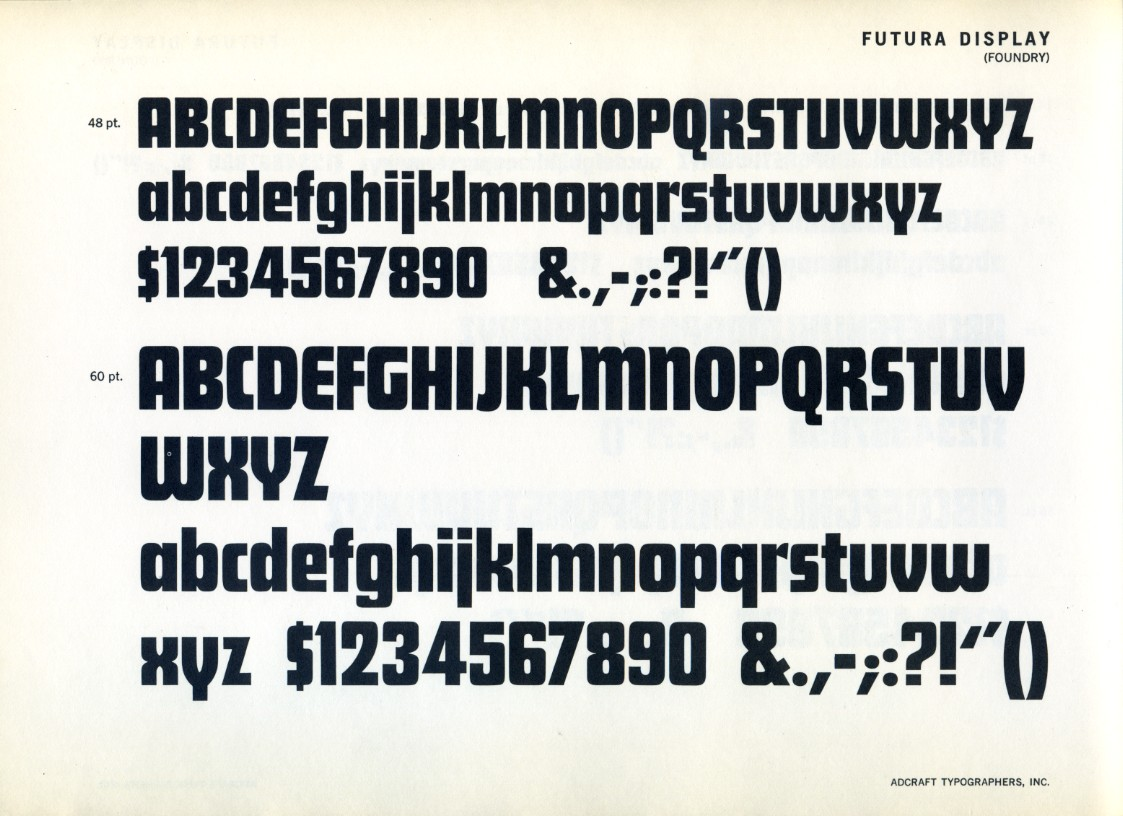
Futura Display in a specimen book.

Released in 1932, Futura Display uses more angular strokes, resulting in rectangular letter forms.

=== Futura Extra Bold ===
Designed in 1952 by Edwin W. Shaar, Futura Extra Bold was film director Stanley Kubrick's favorite typeface.

=== Futura Black ===
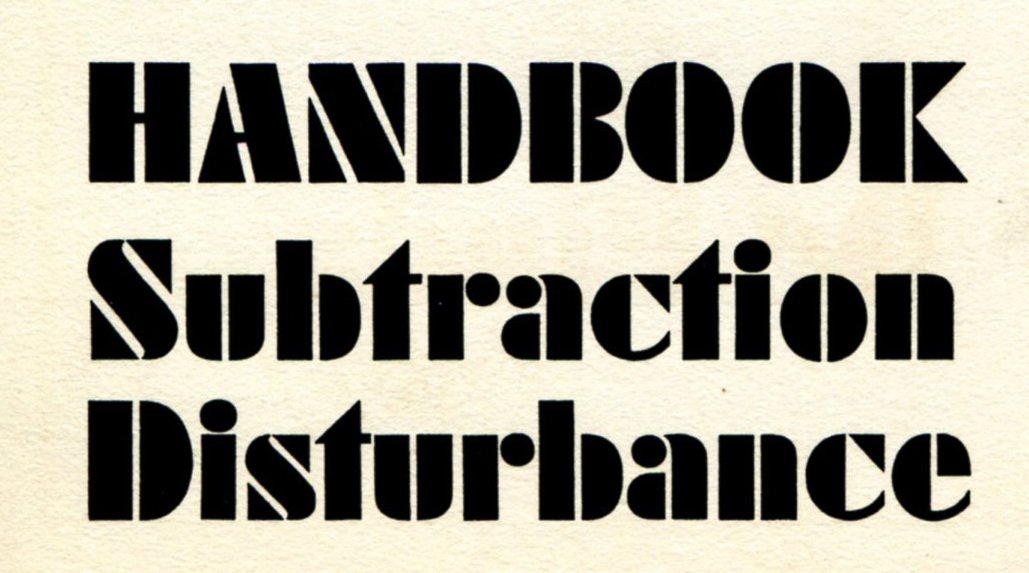
A metal type specimen of Futura Black

First released in 1929, Futura Black is an alternative design that uses stencil letter forms, high contrast and triangular serifs, with similarities to fat face types. Example uses of the font include the public safety departments of the city of Boston, the "R" logo of the National Association of Realtors, title sequences of television programs such as The Love Boat and Prisoner: Cell Block H, the wordmark for the defunct discount store chain Bradlees, and as the wordmark for the National Football League's Minnesota Vikings from 1982 to 2003. The movie logo for the 2021 James Bond film No Time to Die also uses Futura Black.

=== Steile Futura ===
Steile Futura was Paul Renner's attempt to create a typeface that would be closer to the nineteenth century sans serifs than to the geometric model. During the course of development, Renner developed several intermediate versions. Some of the early design could be found in the experimental font called Renner-Grotesk, which appeared as a trial type casting from the Stempel type foundry in 1936. Renner kursiv, a true italic companion to the regular version, was made after Stempel had been taken over by Bauer in 1938.

The work on the type family continued in the 1940s, but Renner's poor health had slowed down the development. Renner started to work again on this project in 1951 under the name of Steile Futura (steil in German means "upright" or "steep").

The font family released by Bauer consist of mager (light), halbfett (medium), fett (bold), kursiv halbfett (medium italic), and kursiv fett (bold italic). The font family was released in 1952–1953. It was sold by Bauer in German, English, Spanish, and French markets as Steile Futura, Bauer Topic, Vox, Zénith respectively.

The font family has rounder letters than Futura Display. For the first time, italic type features are incorporated in the italic fonts. The fonts incorporate handwriting features, especially in italic version. URW and Berthold have released digitisations, URW's under the name of "Topic", its name in original release in some non-German speaking countries. Tasse by Font Bureau is a loose adaptation.

=== Futura Inline ===
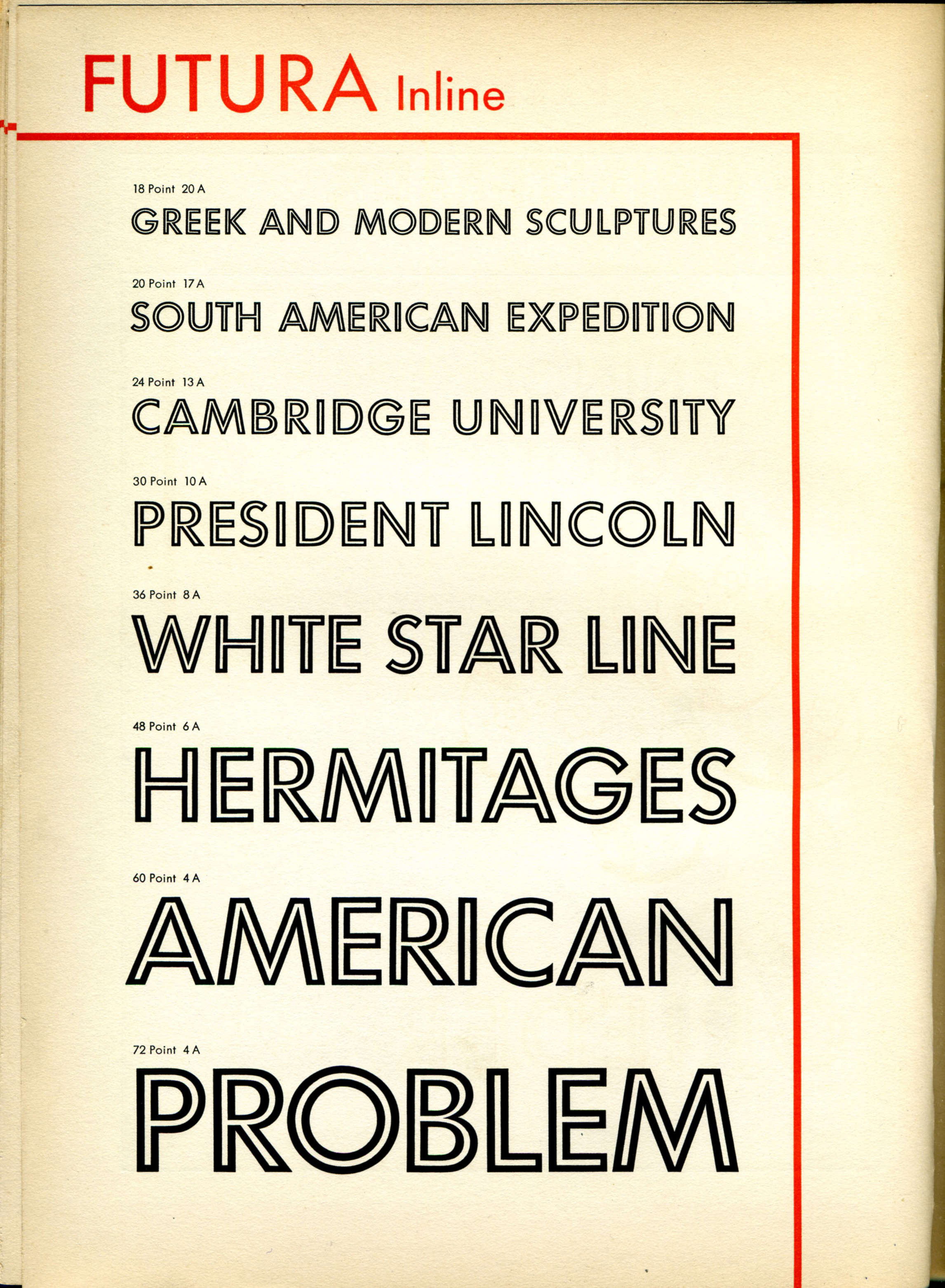
Sample of the font Futura Inline in metal type.

An "inline" version with a line drawn through each letter.

== Digitisations ==
With the demise of hot metal typesetting, Futura has been redrawn in digital formats. Because of complex licensing agreements, there is no one digital version of Futura but several, each with different features. (Some releases may be re-drawings or upgraded versions of earlier digital releases.) Releases of Futura exist from Linotype, Bitstream, URW++ (several), Elsner+Flake and many others under that name, and by many other companies under others because of rights issues. For example, Fontsite's (including Futura Black and Poster) is renamed as 'Function'.

As with all metal type revivals, converting Futura into a digital format poses interpretative challenges. Metal type fonts could be made differently for each text size, so a variety of metal and phototype versions of Futura exist on which a revival could potentially be based. In addition, revivals will need to add characters not present in the original Futura like the Euro sign and Cyrillic, and therefore do not all have the same character set.

Futura revivals may also decide to make design changes, like replacing Futura's straight 'j' with a more conventional substitute as URW's revival does. Scangraphic's revival notably includes optical sizes, with a tighter-spaced design (SH) created for headlines and a more spread-out version (SB) for body text sizes. As an assessment of the decisions involved, a wide-ranging review by Stephen Coles of digitisations of Futura and its competitor geometrics noted that Bitstream's "abandons some of the strict geometry in favour of a more harmonious whole, but it may not be the Futura you were expecting", and that URW's Futura Nr. 2 was "Possibly optimized for small text: it's wider, ascenders shorter, counters larger, and apertures more open. Conversely, round glyphs (a, g, e,) are more true to the circle. This attribute doesn't make this a great text face, but if you want that strict geometry, No. 2 delivers".

=== Architype Renner (1993) ===
Released by The Foundry in 1993, reproduces the experimental alternate characters and old style text figures of Paul Renner's 1927–29 typeface Futura. The alternate characters Renner proposed were mostly deleted from the typeface, resulting in a more conventional, and perhaps more successful typeface. The old style text figures disappeared at the end of 1920s, when the typeface was released in America. The Archetype Renner typefaces are a faithful recreation of Renner's original designs and released by The Foundry as single regular weight. Archetype Renner Bold was originally released by The Foundry in 1996 as part of the Archetype 2 series and in 2011 it was expanded as a 4 weight family: Regular, Medium, Demi and Bold.

=== Futura ND, Futura ND Black, Futura ND Display (1999) ===
The letter G from the Neufville digitisation of Futura, compared to perfect circles.

This version is based on the original sources of the Bauersche Gießerei, which had passed its typefaces to its Barcelona branch, Fundición Tipográfica Bauer SL. Released in 1999 by Neufville Digital — a joint venture of Fundición Tipográfica Bauer SL and Visualogik Technology & Design b.v — it includes small capitals and the old-style figures that had not been made in metal types. The redesign was done by Marie-Thérèse Koreman.

Neufville Digital issued Futura, Futura Black, Futura Condensed, and Futura Display (Futura Schlagzeile) under the Futura ND family. A limited release with some weights and features missing is bundled with macOS.

OpenType features included stylistic alternates, lining figures, proportional figures, old style figures, tabular figures, fractions, standard/discretional ligatures, superscript, and small caps.

=== Futura ND Alternate (2015) ===
Designed by Marie-Thérèse Koreman, it is a version of Futura ND published by Bauersche Gießerei. with alternate character designs, which also includes more angular glyphs found in early versions of Futura.

The family includes 50 fonts in 6 weights and 2 widths, with book and demibold missing in condensed width, with complementary oblique.

=== Futura Next (2016) ===
Designed by Marie-Thérèse Koreman, it is a version of Futura ND Alternate with alternate characters designed for small or low resolution displays.

The family includes 20 fonts in 6 weights and 2 widths, with book and demibold missing in condensed width, with complementary oblique. Small caps and old style figures are included in 18 fonts.

=== ParaType version ===
The ParaType fonts added Cyrillic characters. They were developed at ParaType (ParaGraph) in 1995 by Vladimir Yefimov. They came in only Light, Book, Medium, and Demi weights.

==== Futura PT ====
This version is based on the previous ParaType design by Vladimir Yefimov (see above), expanded to include seven weights, with Book, Medium, Bold, Extra Bold weights for condensed fonts. Additional Cyrillic styles were developed in 2007 by Isabella Chaeva.

==== Futura Futuris ====
Futuris is a redesign at ParaType (ParaGraph) in 1991 by Vladimir Yefimov that includes Cyrillic characters. Condensed styles were added in 1993 by Vladimir Yefimov and Alexander Tarbeev. It is available in Light, Medium, Bold, Black (without oblique) weights, while condensed fonts were made in Bold, Extra Bold, all without obliques. Also available are Cameo Extra Bold (black in reverse), Shadow Light, Shadow Extra Bold (black with shadow), Volume Light.

==== Futura Eugenia ====
This version is based on the Futura Black, but designed at the Polygraphmash type design bureau in 1987 by Elvira Slysh.

=== Bukra ===
Bukra is an Arabic variant designed by Pascal Zoghbi. It consists of Bukra Extra Bold, which was used as an Arabic display typeface for Ibn Battuta Mall in Dubai as a complement for Futura Extra Bold. The design was based on Kufi script, but using shortened descenders. The name Bukra itself is a phonetic representation of one way to express "tomorrow" or "in the future" in some Arabic cultures.

=== URW++ ===
Unusually, URW has two main digitisations, Futura and Futura No. 2. Futura 1 has the larger range of weights with some unusual versions like stencil and shadowed designs, while Futura No. 2 has, amongst other differences, a conventional 'j' in all the non-condensed weights apart from demi-bold, but no italics except in some bold weights. According to URW, No. 2 is based on Letraset's version. It has also released some styles as Futura 3 and 7.

=== Futura Classic ===
This release by Gert Wiescher is notable for presenting the original alternate characters planned by Renner. They have also appeared on a digitisation of Twentieth Century, Monotype's competitor to Futura, a release which allows them to be mixed and matched with the more standard characters and small caps.

=== Formera ===
Formera by Bastien Sozoo. Based on metal types from 1927.

This free and open source typeface, originally called FuturaRenner, was digitized by Bastien Sozoo in 2011 while a student at La Cambre art school in Brussels. The metal lead type in the letterpress facility of the school were given by Renner to Henry Van de Velde, the school's founder, and the original 1927 forms are, as Sozoo described it, "the first draft of Futura as we know it". While the capital letters are very similar to their modern counterparts (some visible differences include capital J's descent below the base line and a slightly higher crossbar on capital A), Formera uses text figures as opposed to the usual lining figures, and the letter forms of r (which has a distinctive dot-and-line styling), m and n (both of which are box-based and unrounded) are in particular contrast to modern Futura adaptations. Formera is available in light and regular weights, both of which are licensed under the SIL Open Font License.

=== Futura Now ===
In October 2020, Monotype re-digitized and released as Futura Now, which is based on Paul Renner's original design with additional 102 styles.

=== Futura100 ===
In June 2025, BauerTypes & TypeTogether announced that they had partnered together to release "Futura100", which they described as "a more accurate, globally inclusive update fully leveraging modern technologies".

== Legacy ==
Though Erbar was the first of the new geometric sans-serif typefaces, the commercial success of Futura encouraged other foundries to create many new similar typefaces to compete with it, including Kabel, Metro, Spartan, Vogue, Twentieth Century, Airport, Semplicità, Bernhard Gothic, and Tempo. Some were near-identical copies, like Spartan and Twentieth Century, while others were more distinct, like Nobel and Kabel. Futura was rebranded in France by Deberny & Peignot as "Europe".

In Germany the designer Arno Drescher created the family Super Grotesk, which became very popular in East Germany after the war. Stephen Coles has described FontShop International's Super Grotesk digitisation as surprisingly useful, noting that its digitisation is unusually well-hinted allowing good display on Windows computers. It also features a conventional 'j'. Another German competitor, also recently digitised by FontFont, was Friedrich Bauer's Bauer Grotesk, issued by J. D. Trennert & Sohn and then Genzsch & Heyse.

Volkswagen's VAG Rounded typeface borrows the same letterforms as Futura, but has rounded terminals on all strokes.

Typeface designer Adrian Frutiger acknowledges Futura as one of his inspirations for his 1988 typeface Avenir. More recently Futura has been the basis of IKEA Sans and Opel Sans, fonts designed (for IKEA and Opel, respectively) by Robin Nicholas.

The Toronto Transit Commission developed the Toronto Subway font based on Futura for use in Toronto subway station signage since 1954.

Tasse is a revival of Steile Futura.

League Spartan and Beteckna are descendants of Futura that are licensed as Free Software (Under the SIL OFL and GNU GPL+FE licenses, respectively).

Century Gothic borrows liberally from Futura letterforms, with the glyphs adjusted to be metrically compatible with another geometric sans-serif, ITC Avant Garde.

Brandon Grotesque is inspired by Futura but with an unusually low x-height, giving it a more elegant appearance for uses such as headings and display settings. Designed by Hannes von Döhren of HVD Fonts, it is the main corporate font of Comedy Central until 2018. In 2014, von Döhren released Brandon Text, a tighter version intended for body text.

Braggadocio is based on Futura Black.

The 2000 typeface Gotham is similarly geometric and based on 1920s signage.

Passata is a modernised version of Futura specifically designed to replace Futura as the corporate branding font of Aarhus University.

Product Sans is similar to Futura with slight differences.

Arve Båtevik designed two typefaces which are based on the Futura typeface: LL Supreme and LL Supreme Display.

Josh Finklea's Centra No.2 is heavily based on Futura.

Kris Sowersby of Klim Type Foundry designed two typefaces which are based on the Futura typeface: The Future and The Future Mono.

== In popular culture ==
American singer Frank Ocean used a customized version of Futura for the cover art of his album Blonde and named its closing song "Futura Free" after it.

== Trademark rights ==
Since 1996, Futura has been a registered trademark of Bauer Types, S.L. in the UK, the US, and the EU.
