= Toronto Subway (typeface) =

Geometric sans-serif typeface

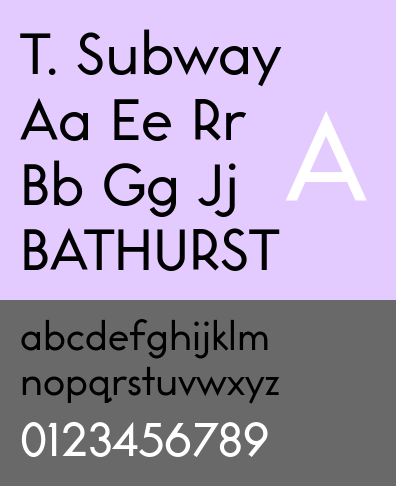
- Category: Sans-serif
- Classification: Geometric
- Designers: original unknown; current release David Vereschagin
- Commissioned by: Toronto Transit Commission
- Date created: c. 1954; 2004 (recreated)
- Design based on: Futura

Toronto Subway (also known as Bloor-Yonge) is a geometric sans-serif typeface designed for the original section of the Toronto Transit Commission's Yonge subway. It is today used at station entrances, fare booths and track level signage throughout the system.

== History ==
The font on the short-lived TTC rapid transit logo, 1946, used during the construction of the subway

The typeface and TTC logo were developed during the construction of Line 1 Yonge–University in the 1940s, perhaps by draughtsman Philip Butt, but this has not been confirmed. The original logo used during the subway's development was designed by mid-century architect John C. Parkin and chief architect Arthur Keith. Against the wishes of Walter Paterson, the chief engineer, TTC chairman William McBrien and general manager H.C. Patten rejected the design in favour of one that was more similar to the one previously used on TTC vehicles.

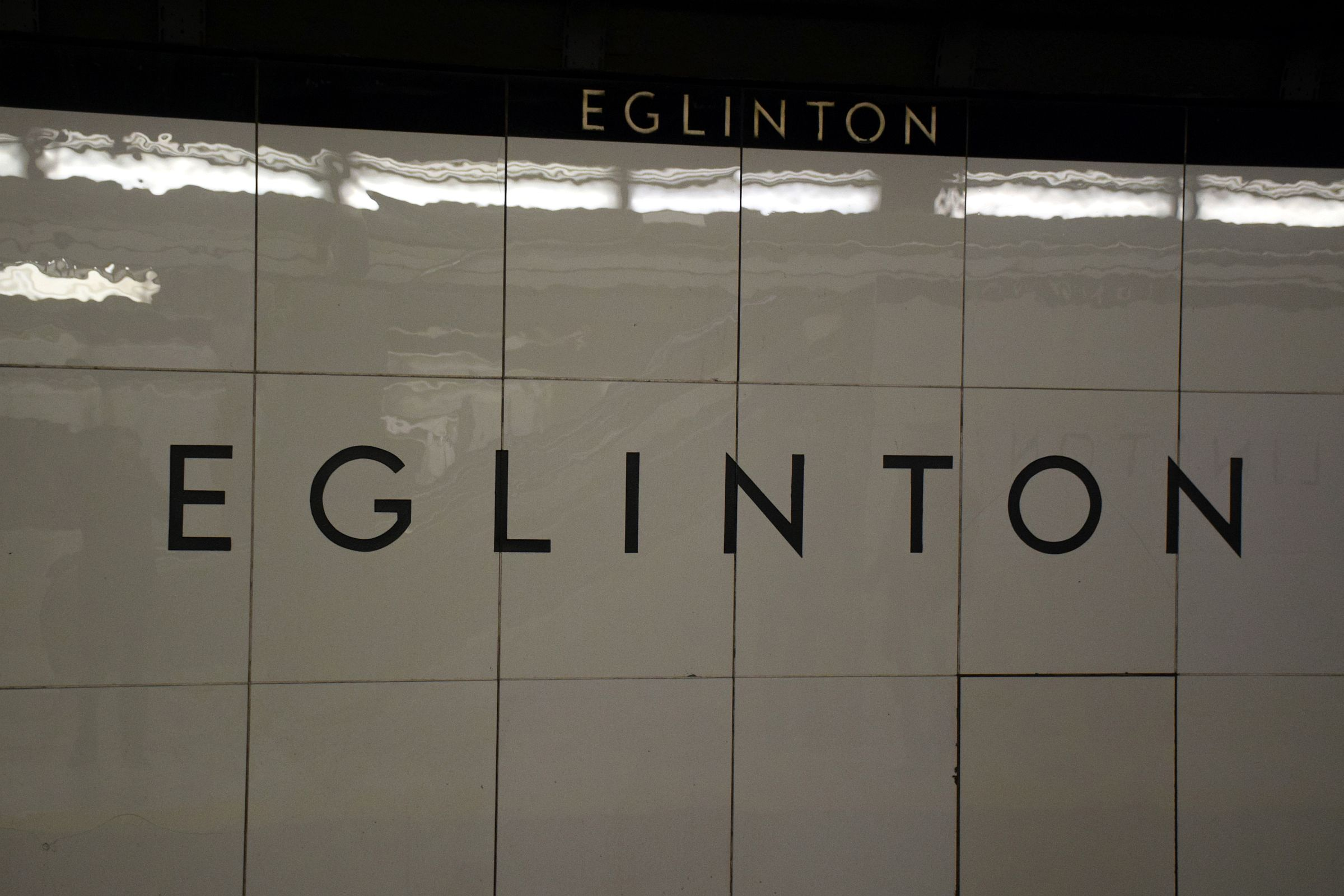
Original 1954 example of the font at Eglinton station

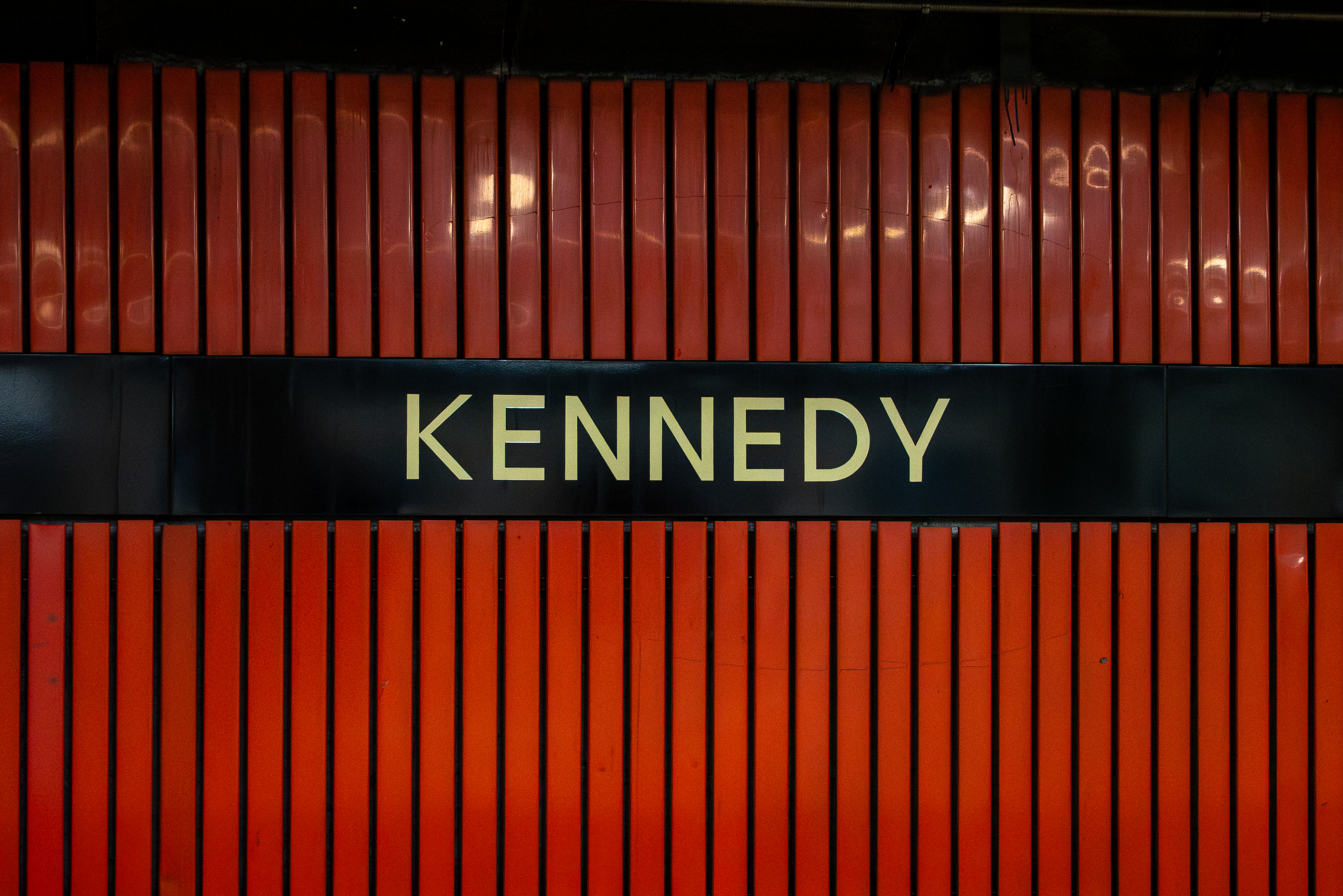
The original Univers typeface at Kennedy station before renovation in 2025

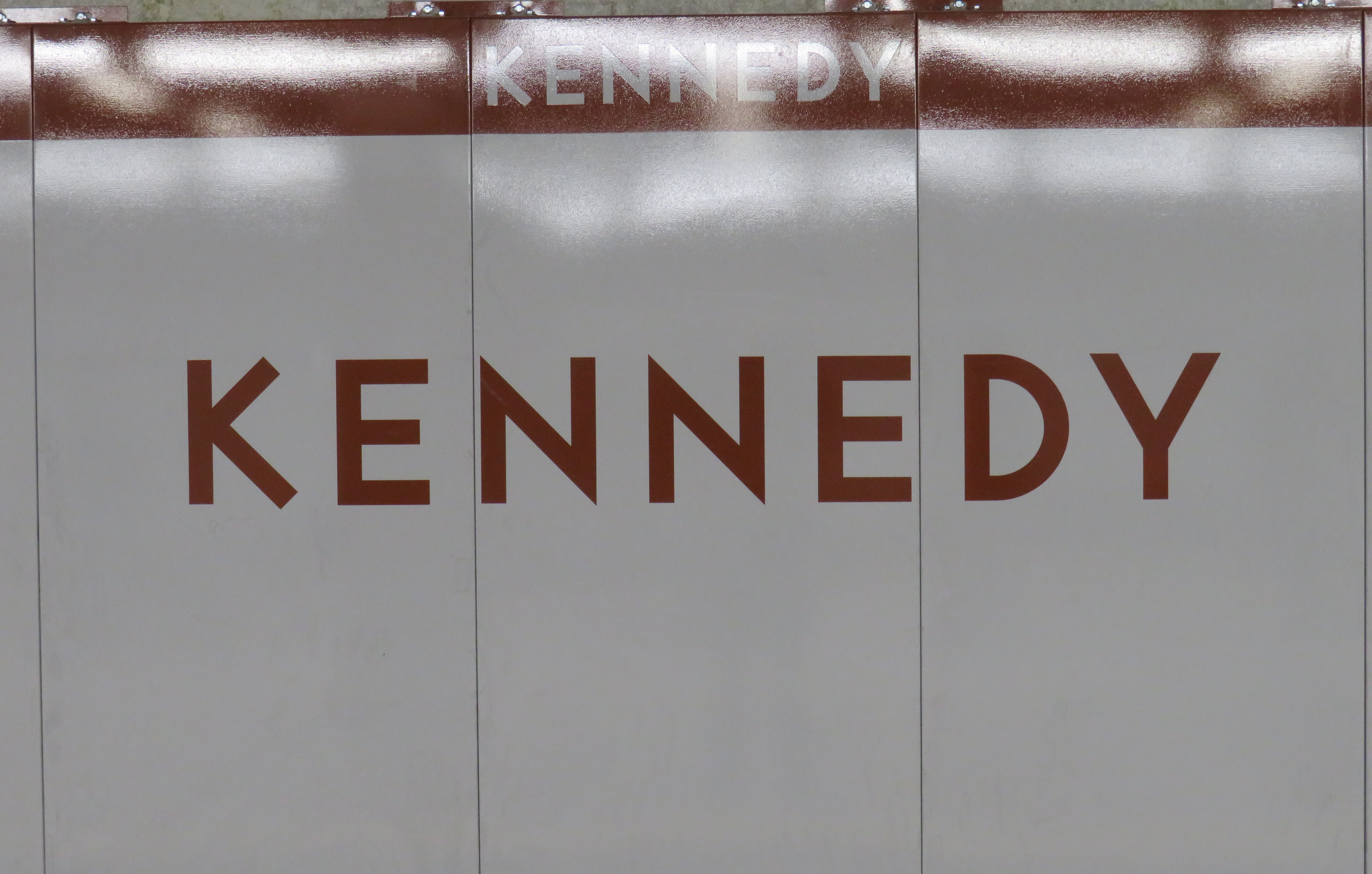
The replacement bold version of the Toronto subway typeface after renovation

The font is a distinctive rectangular font composed of capital letters etched into the tiles of Toronto subway stations opened between 1954 and 1974, as well as on signs. Over time, it was replaced by both Helvetica and Univers 55 on the original Line 1 Yonge–University (from Union to Eglinton stations) as a result of renovations to all stations along that line, except for Eglinton, St. Clair, Summerhill, Wellesley, trim lettering at Queen, and various directional signs. A bold version (the later standard) of this font can be seen at every station along the Line 2 Bloor–Danforth from Kipling to Kennedy. It can also be seen at most stations north of Bloor–Yonge station on the eastern branch of Line 1, at stations on the western branch of Line 1 from Union to St. George, and was incorporated into the renovated Bloor, Wellesley, and Union stations. The other fonts, used at stations on system extensions built from the late 1970s to the 1990s, have also been replaced with the recreated font at a few stations: the original Univers 55 at Wilson station was partially replaced with it, and a full replacement of the original fonts was done in 2017 at Kipling and 2025 at Kennedy, when they were renovated, and at Sheppard West and Cedarvale, when their names were changed from Downsview and Eglinton West in 2017 and 2025 respectively. Toronto Subway is used at all stations built from 2002 onwards—such as Line 4 Sheppard and the Toronto–York Spadina subway extension—as well as on all stops and stations along the rebuilt 512 St. Clair streetcar line, with the exception of the transfer terminal at St. Clair West station. It is also used at stations on Line 5 Eglinton and Line 6 Finch.

The font was recreated by David Vereschagin in 2004. Because the original designer of the font is unknown, and no documentation of the font had been kept, Vereschagin digitized the font by visiting stations and making rubbings of the letters on the original Vitrolite glass tiles as well as taking photographs. This is now used by the TTC as their font for station names. Vereschagin designed a matching lowercase, inspired by Futura and other similar designs. As one of the few typeface designs to have originated in Canada, it was used in a number of zines as a mark of local pride.

In 2011, Dominion Modern ran an exhibit on Toronto Subway at George Brown's School of Design.

On October 23, 2013, the TTC announced new wayfinding standards, including using Toronto Subway "on more signage – at station entrances, fares booths and track level signage". This decision was made in conjunction with officially adding route numbers to the subway and RT lines. The wayfinding team also created an overhauled version of the Subway typeface called Bloor–Yonge, which includes missing numerals (which were necessary for signage for Highway 407 station) and punctuation, as well as correcting some design issues with the existing glyphs.

== Features ==
Notable features:

- near-perfect circles for C, G, O, and Q;
- middle horizontal strokes along a horizontal mid-line for B, E, F and H;
- a Futura-like S composed of two semicircles;
- strokes that tend toward straight lines (even the stem of the distinctive low-waist R) and terminate at right angles;
- sharp corners on M, N, V, and W that descend below the baseline or project above the cap height.

== Similar fonts ==
The Toronto Subway font is based on Futura. Somewhat similar typefaces include Johnston (used by Transport for London), Verlag, Bernhard Gothic, Metro, Brandon Grotesque, Neutraface, and Eagle.

== See also ==
- Public signage typefaces
