= Futuracha Pro =

- Category: Display
- Designer: Odysseas Galinos Paparounis
- Date released: 2018

Futuracha Pro is a typeface designed in 2017 by Odysseas Galinos Paparounis, founder of Athens-based design agency Høly, an agency made up of "curious designers". The appearance of individual letters adjusts automatically depending on the words typed. The shape and design of the font, which has Art Deco and Art Nouveau stylings, was inspired by a cockroach's movements. Paparounis became fascinated with the insects' curled antennae and thick, prickly legs. These features inspired the organic aesthetic of Futuracha Pro, and its name, a combination of "Futura" and "cucaracha" (cockroach)

After years of difficult development, Futuracha was released in 2019. Paparounis and his team changed the name from Futuracha to Decoracha, stating "Decoracha is not only claiming the unique character that the new font needed, directly attached to its art deco roots, but also helps it start a brand-new journey, as an exclusively decorative – and no longer futuristic – font."
