= The Wheel of Time (album) =

Studio album by Sandra
- Released: 29 April 2002
- Genre: Pop
- Length: 44:55
- Label: Virgin
- Producers: Michael Cretu, Jens Gad

Sandra chronology
My Favourites (1999)	The Wheel of Time (2002)	Reflections (2006)

Singles from The Wheel of Time
- 1. "Forever" Released: October 2001; 2. "Such a Shame" Released: March 2002; 3. "I Close My Eyes" Released: November 2002

Professional ratings
Review scores
Source	Rating
laut.de	3/5 stars

The Wheel of Time is the seventh studio album by German singer Sandra, released in 2002 by Virgin Records.

== Overview ==
The Wheel of Time was produced by Michael Cretu and Jens Gad, and was Sandra's first album with new material in seven years, as Michael Cretu had been busy with his main music project, Enigma. In addition to new compositions, it included covers of the 1980s songs "Such a Shame" originally performed by Talk Talk, "Silent Running (On Dangerous Ground)" by Mike and the Mechanics, and "Motivation" by the German duo Inker & Hamilton, as well as a cover of Depeche Mode's "Freelove". The album continued Sandra's trend of getting more experimental with sound, spanning new wave and downtempo music in addition to pop. The cover photos were taken by Jim Rakete and picture Sandra sporting a shorter bob instead of her signature long hair. The album's logo is in the Agency FB font.

The album was preceded by the single "Forever", released in the autumn of 2001, which was a moderate success in Germany and featured a modern music video. In 2002, "Such a Shame" and "I Close My Eyes" were released as singles, but performed poorly on the German singles chart. "Forgive Me" was distributed to radio stations as a promotional single only in Germany in June 2002, but its regular single release was eventually cancelled.

The Wheel of Time entered the German albums chart at no. 8 and also reached the top 40 on the pan-European albums sales chart.

== Track listing ==
1. "Forgive Me" (Michael Cretu) — 4:25
2. "Footprints" (Dawn Schoenherz, Wolfgang Filz) — 3:44
3. "Motivation" (Dave Inker) — 4:03
4. "I Close My Eyes" (Andy Jonas, Michael Cretu) — 4:07
5. "Perfect Touch" (Heidemarie Jedner, Peter Ries, Wolfgang Filz) — 3:45
6. "Silent Running" (Mike Rutherford, BA Robertson) — 4:18
7. "Such a Shame" (Mark Hollis) — 4:21
8. "Now!" (Michael Cretu, Jens Gad) — 4:02
9. "Free Love" (Martin Gore) — 4:16
10. "Forever" (Peter Ries, Wolfgang Filz) — 3:46
11. "The Wheel of Time" (Michael Cretu, Jens Gad) — 4:08

== Charts ==
Chart (2002)	Peak position
Austrian Albums (Ö3 Austria)	63
Czech Albums (ČNS IFPI)	17
European Albums (Music & Media)	35
German Albums (Offizielle Top 100)	8
Swiss Albums (Schweizer Hitparade)	68
