= Roger Black (disambiguation) =

Roger Black may refer to:

- Roger Black (born 1966), English athlete
- Roger Black (actor) (born 1975), American actor and comedian
- Roger Black (graphic designer) (born 1948), American graphic designer
