= Passata (font) =

Geometric sans-serif typeface

Passata is a sans-serif font designed specially for Aarhus University as part of a new visual identity implemented in late 2008. It is a modernised version of Futura, which it replaced as their corporate branding font.
