= Sara Soskolne =

Canadian type designer (born 1970)

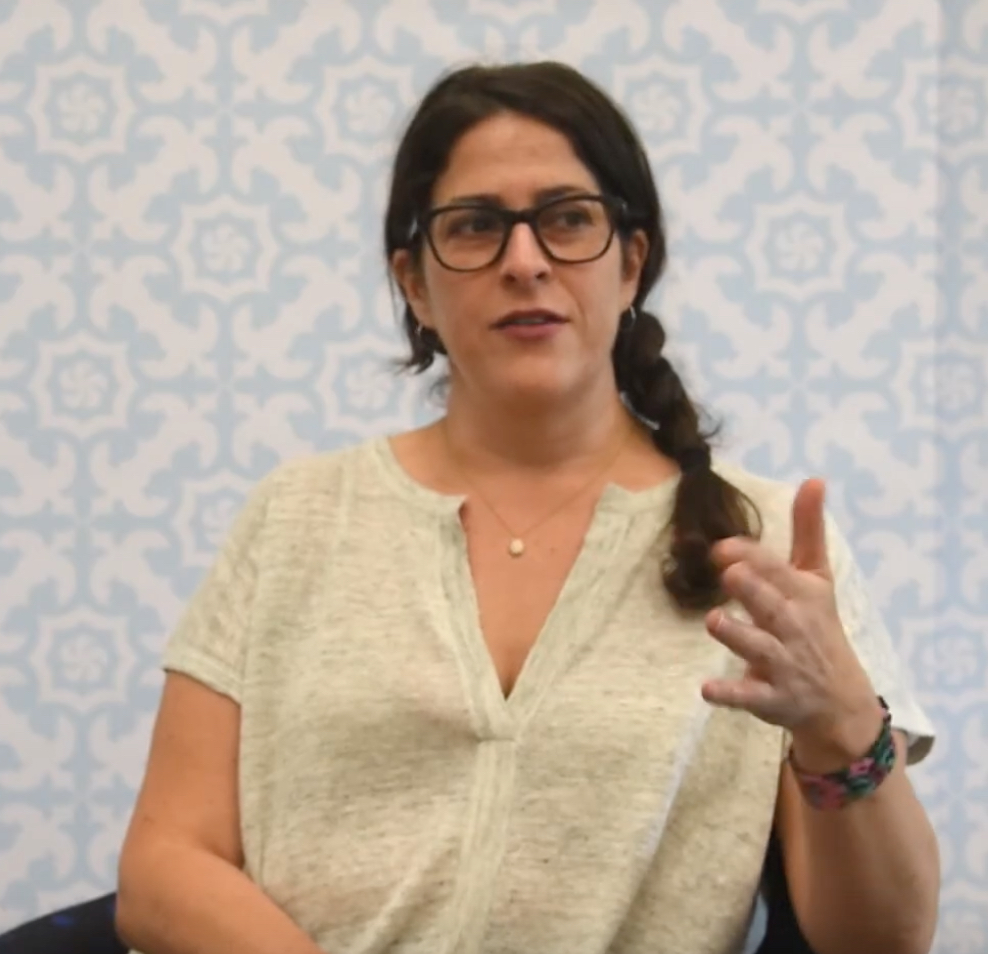
- Occupation: Type designer
- Known for: Work done at Hoefler & Frere-Jones and Monotype
- Notable work: Gotham typeface

Sara Soskolne (born 1970) is a Canadian type designer best known for her work at Hoefler & Frere-Jones (H&FJ) type foundry on typefaces such as Gotham. After ten years working in graphic design in Toronto, Soskolne attended the University of Reading where she received her MA in 2003.

She has taught type design at Yale School of Art, the Book Arts Institute at Wells College, and New York's School of Visual Arts and the Cooper Union's Type Certificate Program. Soskolne has written about the evolution of sans-serif lower case types in the 19th century.

After the acquisition of Hoefler & Co. by Monotype in 2021, Solskone became a Creative Type Director working on multiple typeface projects for various clients, including a new set of Gotham styles for use by the Obama Foundation.

== Typefaces ==
- Verlag (with H&FJ) 1996
- Gotham (with H&FJ) 2001
- Chronicle (with H&FJ) 2002
- Sentinel (with H&FJ) 2002
- Tungsten (with H&FJ)
- Gotham Slab Condensed, Gotham Stencil Condensed, and Gotham Inline Condensed were designed at Monotype and released in 2025 for the Obama Foundation
