= Surveyor (typeface) =

Digital serif typeface

Surveyor is a Didone serif typeface that recalls type found on engraved maps and charts. It was designed by Tobias Frere-Jones in 2001 as a custom typeface for use in Martha Stewart Living magazine and released publicly in March 2013, in a wider range of styles, by the type foundry Hoefler & Frere-Jones (now known as Hoefler&Co.).

Describing it, Jonathan Hoefler said:

We had the twin goals of making a typeface that felt very handmade, to evoke the craft philosophy of the magazine, and that could handle all of the charts, tables, recipes, graphs, almanacs and step-by-step instructions that they run in the magazine. We had been waiting to do a typeface based on the distinct style of lettering you find on engraved maps ... A lot of the time, there are things that can be incorporated into the font that are relatively simple – like switching out an alternate character or interpolating a slightly different weight – that are easy for us to do in the process, but can save hundreds of hours in the client's production department.

Surveyor has a vertical axis and a high contrast of stroke weight similar to Bodoni or Didot but a less strident, more organic, structure recalling early nineteenth century faces like Bell, Scotch Roman, and Thorowgood. The italics have a slightly more extreme forward slant than is common and curved strokes often terminate in a ball.

== Styles ==
Surveyor's most notable feature is its extremely wide range of weights and styles, designed to provide many options for complex publications such as magazines. The typeface is created in weights from light to black, with italic styles offering designs with or without swashes. Swashes themselves are controlled programmatically so that they only appear where there is space for them, so words that are fully capitalised only have swashes at the start. It is also sold in three different optical sizes, for text printed in different sizes from small to large.
