= Gert Wiescher =

German graphic artist, type designer, and author (1944–2022)

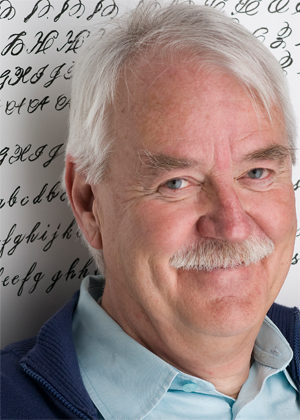
Portrait of Gert Wiescher

Gert Wiescher (26 July 1944, in Braunsbach am Kocher – February 2022) was a German graphic artist, type designer and author. He was known for an almost complete re-design of Bodoni classic typefaces, the work of Giambattista Bodoni, the 17th-century Italian typographer. His Bodoni Classic typefaces are considered very close to the authentic version. He has also designed many new typefaces.

== Biography ==
At 14 years of age Wiescher went to Paris to study fine art. He financed his stay by doing portraits on the Place du Tertre on Montmartre. In the 60s Wiescher studied graphic design at the Berlin Academy of Fine Arts (Since November 2001, Berlin University of the Arts). He financed his studies by sidewalk painting and drawing portraits. While doing sidewalk paintings, he met the typeface designer Erik Spiekermann, who inspired his love of this branch of design. After two years he quit his studies and went to Barcelona where he worked at the offices of Harnden & Bombelli, for whom he designed the OECD-Pavilion of the 1970 Osaka World Expo. In 1972 he moved on to Johannesburg working as an art director at Grey and Young advertising . In 1975, he returned to Germany, working first for DFS+R-Dorland, and then for the "Herrwerth & Partner" ad agency. At Herrworth, he was involved in introducing IKEA into the German market. In 1977 he became a creative partner in the Lauenstein & Partner ad agency, creating mainly campaigns for large German retail chains. In 1982 he started his own design office, creating work for editors (Markt & Technik, Systhema and Langen-Müller-Herbig), computer companies (House of Computers, FileNet) and he worked for Apple Computers designing their publications (Apple-Age and Apple-LIVE).

== Typeface design ==
With the first Apple Macintosh he started to digitalize typefaces for his own use. This work resulted in a first small typeface collection, which he marketed through FontShop. He suggested the idea of recreating the Bodoni original typefaces to FontShop, and worked on the "Bodoni-Classic" family for more than ten years. Building on this, he has created, to date, over 300 font families with far more than 1000 different weights, and is probably Germany's most prolific type designer. Wiescher's work also includes a new version of the Logotype for the Munich local newspaper Abendzeitung (Evening Newspaper). For "VOGUE" Moscow he developed a special Cyrillic version of Bodoni Classic. Ringier publishers in Zürich also use a special Bodoni Classic version.

Wiescher's typeface "Red Tape" is on permanent exhibition at the German National Library in Leipzig.

Wiescher had two sons.

Wiescher died in February 2022. According to his friend Erik Spiekermann he never fully recovered from a COVID infection in 2020.

=== Publications ===
- Gert Wiescher: Professionelles Gestalten mit PageMaker., Markt & Technik Verlag, Munich 1988, ISBN 3-89090-584-6
- Gert Wiescher: Desktop Advertising., Wirtschaftsverlag Langen Müller/Herbig, Munich 1990, ISBN 3-7844-7261-3
- Gert Wiescher: Zeitschriften & Broschüren., Systhema-Verlag, Munich 1990, ISBN 3-89390-312-7
- Gert Wiescher: Professionelles Gestalten mit PageMaker 4.0., Systhema-Verlag, Munich 1991, ISBN 3-89390-356-9
- Gert Wiescher: Schriftdesign., Systhema-Verlag, Munich 1991, ISBN 3-89390-316-X
- Gert Wiescher: Logos, Monogramme & Icons., Systhema-Verlag, Munich 1991, ISBN 3-89390-315-1
- Gert Wiescher: Blitzkurs Typografie., Systhema-Verlag, Munich 1992, ISBN 3-89390-446-8
- Gert Wiescher: Blitzkurs Zeitschriftengestaltung., Systhema-Verlag, Munich 1992, ISBN 3-89390-943-5
- Gert Wiescher: Blitzreferenz Farbe., Systhema-Verlag, Munich 1992, ISBN 3-89390-447-6
- Gert Wiescher: Geliebte Provenzalische Küche., Mary-Hahn-Verlag, Munich 1996, ISBN 3-87287-431-4
- Gert Wiescher: Crostini und Panini., Mary-Hahn-Verlag, Munich 1998, ISBN 3-87287-451-9
- Gert Wiescher: Für Gäste das Beste., Mary-Hahn-Verlag, Munich 2001, ISBN 3-87287-492-6
- Gert Wiescher: Das Brain Projekt., Kindle Edition, 2011, ASIN B005T2XBIW
- Gert Wiescher: User Manual Europe., English Kindle Edition, 2011, ASIN B00533K69Y
