= Archer (typeface) =

Slab serif typeface

- Category: Serif
- Classification: Humanist slab serif
- Designers: Tobias Frere-Jones; Jonathan Hoefler
- Foundry: Hoefler & Co.
- Date created: 2001

Archer is a slab serif typeface designed in 2001 by Tobias Frere-Jones and Jonathan Hoefler for use in Martha Stewart Living magazine. It was later released by Hoefler & Frere-Jones for commercial licensing.

== Structure ==
The typeface is a geometric slab serif, which takes inspiration from mid-twentieth century designs such as Courier and Landi. Ball terminals were added to the upper terminals on letters such as C and G to increase its charm. Italics are true italic designs, with flourishes influenced by calligraphy, an unusual feature for geometric slab serif designs.

== Uses ==
The typeface has been used for, among other things, branding for Wells Fargo and is a main font for the San Francisco Chronicle and Wes Anderson's film The Grand Budapest Hotel.
