= Brandon Grotesque =

Geometric sans-serif typeface

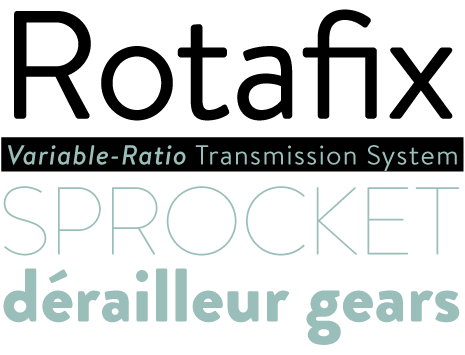
- Category: Sans-serif
- Designer: Hannes von Döhren
- Foundry: HVD Fonts
- Date created: 2009–2010
- Variations: Brandon Text; Rimowa Type (for Rimowa); Bogle (for Walmart)

Brandon Grotesque is a sans-serif typeface designed by Hannes von Döhren of HVD Fonts during 2009 and 2010. Spacing and kerning was done by Igino Marini of iKern. The typeface includes Thin, Light, Regular, Medium, Bold and Black weights. Italic versions were also made available for each weight.

The typeface can be classified as a geometric sans-serif, heavily inspired by the typefaces of same classification during the 1920s and 1930s (e.g. Kabel and Futura). It was designed to appear elegant through having a low x-height, a less common characteristic for sans-serif fonts.

In 2014, von Döhren released Brandon Text, a tighter version intended for body text.

== Usage ==
From 2010 to 2018, it has been the corporate font of Comedy Central, used on promotional materials, idents and posters, such as for its Rally to Restore Sanity and/or Fear event, together with the font Eames Century Modern.

Brandon Grotesque was selected as the wordmark typeface of Brandon University's revised logo.

A custom version of Brandon Text, Bogle, was created for Walmart in 2017. Bogle adds additional rounding to the Brandon Text characters, and elements of the Walmart spark logo, to Brandon Text. The font was named Bogle after Bob Bogle, Sam Walton’s assistant who coined the name Walmart. The font was retired in 2025, replaced by Everyday Sans, Walmart's new custom font based from the Antique Olive typeface.
