= Jonathan Hoefler =

American type designer (born 1970)

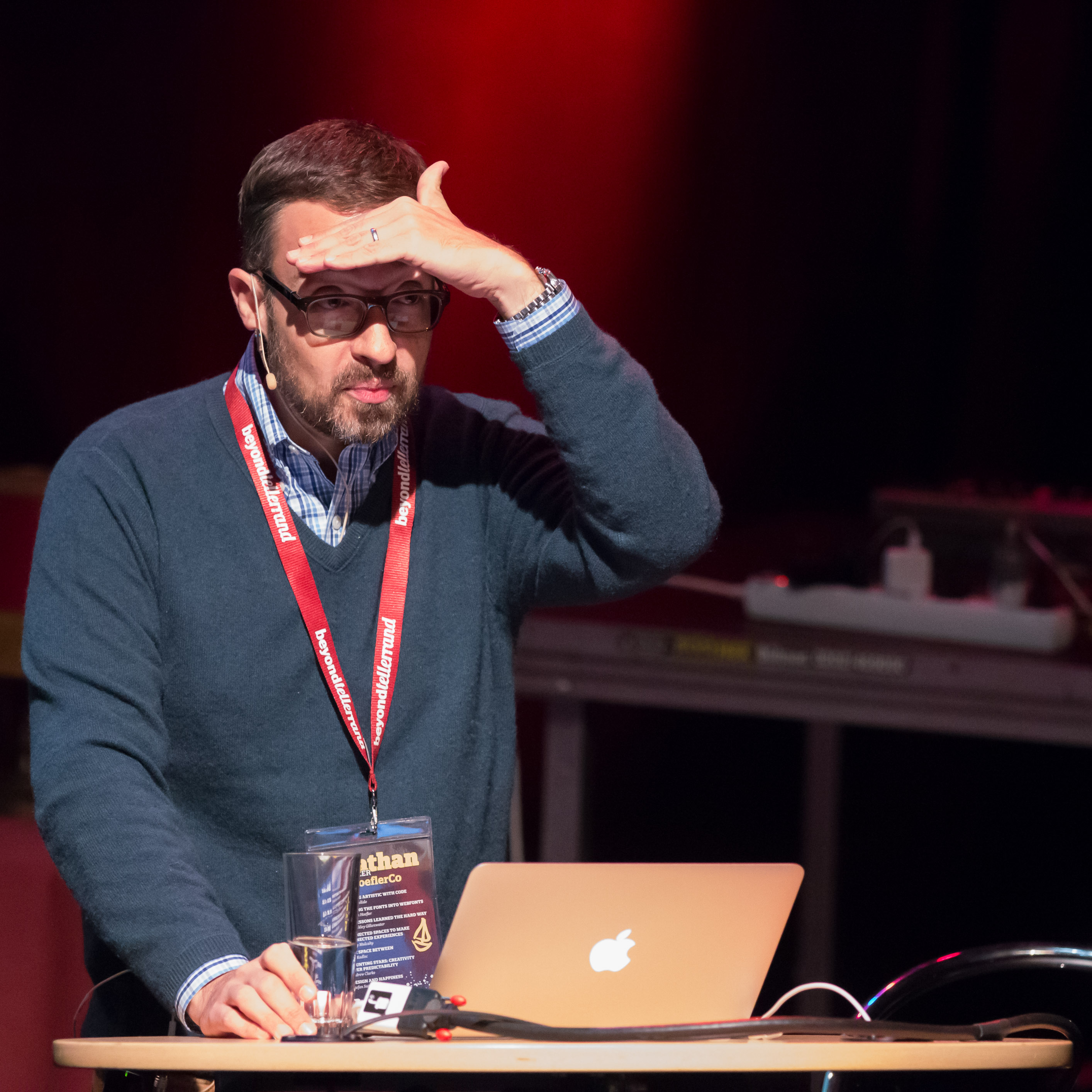
- Hoefler in 2014
- Born: August 22, 1970 (age 56); New York City, New York, US
- Occupation: Type designer
- Employer: Hoefler & Co.
- Notable work: Hoefler Text (1991); Archer (2001)
- Website: jonathanhoefler.com

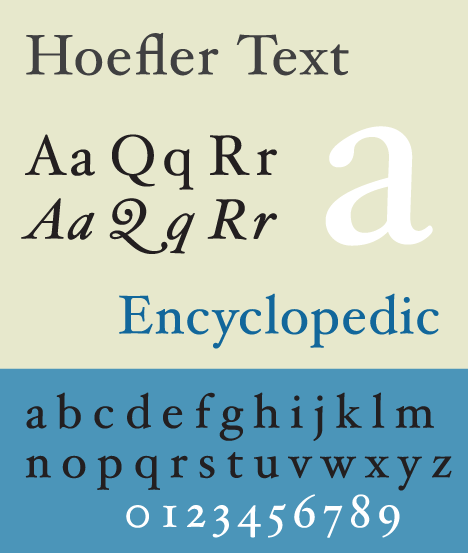
Hoefler Text, a serif typeface designed by Hoefler in 1991

Jonathan Hoefler (/ˈhɛflər/; born 1970) is an American type designer. Hoefler founded the Hoefler Type Foundry in 1989, a type foundry in New York.

== Early life ==
Jonathan Hoefler was born on August 22, 1970, in New York City to Doreen Benjamin and Charles Hoefler, a theatrical set designer and producer. Growing up, it was the Gill Sans text on boxes of custard that drew him to typography design. He is largely self-taught, and worked with magazine art director Roger Black prior to forming the Hoefler Type Foundry in 1989.

== Career ==
Hoefler's Champion Gothic was inspired by 19th-century wood type. It was commissioned for Sports Illustrated shortly after founding the company in 1989. In 1997, his path crossed with type designer Tobias Frere-Jones when both were trying to purchase German type foundry catalogs. In 1999, Hoefler began working with Frere-Jones, and from 2005 to 2014 the company operated under the name Hoefler & Frere-Jones as a partnership. In 2000, the firm, under Frere-Jones' direction, designed its ubiquitous Gotham typeface for GQ magazine and received wide recognition for their work and in the last 20 years as one of the most successful typefaces.

Hoefler's process when designing typefaces begins with research into historical records and then utilizes the programming language Python to automate repetitive tasks. His typefaces are systematic and logical and incorporate specific features based on research. Hoefler has designed original typefaces for Rolling Stone, Harper’s Bazaar, The New York Times Magazine, Sports Illustrated, and Esquire and several institutional clients, including the Solomon R. Guggenheim Museum and alternative band They Might Be Giants. Perhaps his best-known work is the Hoefler Text family of typefaces, designed for Apple Computer and now appearing as part of the Macintosh operating system. He also designed the current wordmark of the Church of Jesus Christ of Latter-day Saints.

In January 2014, Frere-Jones sued Hoefler for $20 million in the New York Supreme Court accusing him of scamming Frere-Jones. Frere-Jones claimed that in 1999, Hoefler agreed to a verbal 50–50 partnership that was legally binding. In light of the lawsuit, Hoefler changed the name back to Hoefler & Co claiming Frere-Jones had only been an employee, citing an agreement that they were not partners but "independent entities" and asked the court to dismiss the case. Fans of the foundry were shocked by the news of the lawsuit. A settlement was subsequently filed in September 2014.

On September 15, 2021, Monotype announced the acquisition of Hoefler & Co. and its font assets. Jonathan Hoefler also announced his intention to retire from the company.

== Awards and recognition ==
In 1995, Hoefler was named one of the forty most influential designers in America by I.D. magazine, and in 2002, the Association Typographique Internationale (ATypI) presented him with its most prestigious award, the Prix Charles Peignot for outstanding contributions to type design.

Hoefler's work is part of the Cooper-Hewitt, National Design Museum's permanent collection. In 2011, the Museum of Modern Art acquired two of Hoefler's typefaces: Mercury, and HTF Didot.

In 2013, Hoefler and Frere-Jones were awarded the AIGA Medal for "their contributions to the typographic landscape through impeccable craftsmanship, skilled historical reference and insightful vernacular considerations."

Hoefler was the subject of an episode of the Netflix's Abstract: The Art of Design documentary series, released in September 2019.

== Typefaces ==
Jonathan Hoefler's typefaces include:

- Gestalt, 1990
- Champion Gothic, 1990
- Hoefler Text, 1991
- Ideal Sans, 1991
- Ziggurat, 1991
- Leviathan, 1991
- Mazarin, 1991
- HTF Didot, 1992
- Requiem Text, 1992
- Saracen, 1992
- Acropolis, 1993
- NYT Cheltenham, 1993
- Knox, 1993
- Historical Allsorts, 1994
- Knockout, 1994
- Fetish, 1994
- Neutrino, 1994
- Quantico, 1994
- Oratorio, 1994
- Troubadour, 1994
- William Maxwell, 1994
- Deseret, 1995
- Jupiter, 1995
- Pavisse, 1995
- Verlag (formerly Guggenheim), 1996
- Giant (formerly They Might Be Gothic), 1996
- New Amsterdam, 1996
- Hoefler Titling, 1996
- Plainsong, 1996
- Kapellmeister, 1997
- Numbers (with Tobias Frere-Jones), 1997–2006
- Mercury, (with Tobias Frere-Jones), 1997
- Radio City, 1998
- Vitesse, (with Tobias Frere-Jones), 2000
- Deluxe, 2000
- Cyclone, 2000
- Topaz, 2000
- Lever Sans, (with Tobias Frere-Jones), 2000
- Archer, (with Tobias Frere-Jones), 2001
- Chronicle, (with Tobias Frere-Jones), 2002
- Sentinel, (with Tobias Frere-Jones), 2002
- Operator, (with Andy Clymer), 2016
- Inkwell, (with Jordan Bell), 2017
- Decimal, 2019
- Sentinel Ornaments (an extension of Sentinel), 2021
- Sagittarius, 2021

Awards
Preceded by Jean François Porchez	Prix Charles Peignot; 2002	Succeeded by Christian Schwartz
