= Agency FB =

Geometric sans-serif typeface

- Category: Sans-serif
- Classification: Geometric
- Designers: David Berlow and Morris Fuller Benton
- Foundry: Font Bureau
- Date released: 1990-1995
- Sample

Font Bureau Agency is a geometric sans-serif typeface family intended for titles and headings, released between 1990 and 1995. It was designed by David Berlow of Font Bureau.

It is an expansion of a capitals-only titling face created in the 1930s by Morris Fuller Benton, adding lower-case characters and a wider range of widths and weights. The expanded design somewhat resembles his classic Bank Gothic.

== Usage ==
Agency is the main font in the first-person shooter franchise Crysis and the 2012 video games Call of Duty: Black Ops II and Hill Climb Racing, and it is used in the logo for the in-development science fiction first-person shooter videogame trilogy Interstellar Marines. The Vancouver Canucks NHL club now uses the font, in modified form, with the introduction of Reebok's Edge uniform style in 2007. Nike has since adopted the typeface for use in its ice hockey uniforms for several countries, beginning in the 2010 Winter Olympics. The font was also widely used in the 2003, space flight simulator game Freelancer. It was also used in the 2009 film 2012. The mobile version of PlayerUnknown's Battlegrounds also utilizes the font in its UI. The Road & Track magazine also used Agency FB from 2011-12. Star Citizen uses the font in its logo. Primary typeface for the Indiana Pacers of the National Basketball Association.

Two styles are supplied with Microsoft Office.

Russian public sports channel Match TV uses a typeface that resembles Agency FB, but with some modifications. The online technology magazine How-To Geek uses the font for its logo.

American soccer club Charleston Battery adopted the font as their primary typeface as part of their rebrand in December 2019. Also the number typeface on the Canada Soccer uniforms for the 2026 FIFA World Cup.

== Agency FB fonts ==
- Agency FB Thin
- Agency FB Light
- Agency FB Regular
- Agency FB Bold
- Agency FB Black
- Agency FB Compressed Thin
- Agency FB Compressed Light
- Agency FB Compressed Regular
- Agency FB Compressed Bold
- Agency FB Compressed Black
- Agency FB Condensed Thin
- Agency FB Condensed Light
- Agency FB Condensed Regular
- Agency FB Condensed Bold
- Agency FB Condensed Black
- Agency FB Wide Thin
- Agency FB Wide Light
- Agency FB Wide Regular
- Agency FB Wide Bold
- Agency FB Wide Black
- Agency FB Extended Thin
- Agency FB Extended Light
- Agency FB Extended Regular
- Agency FB Extended Bold
- Agency FB Extended Black
