= Hoefler Text =

Serif font

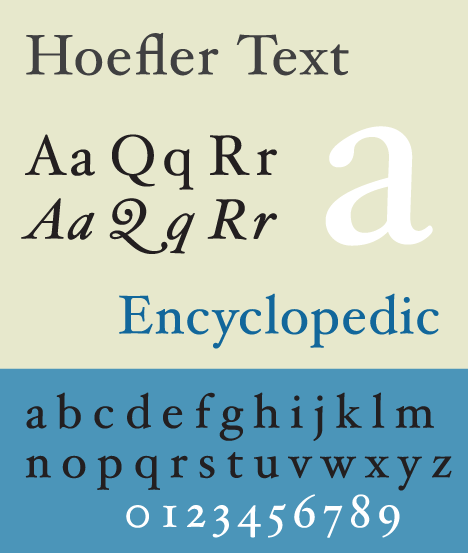
- Category: Serif
- Classification: Old-style
- Designer: Jonathan Hoefler
- Foundry: Apple Computer
- Date released: 1991
- Re-issuing foundries: Hoefler & Co.

Hoefler Text is an old-style serif font designed by Jonathan Hoefler and released by Apple Computer Inc. (now Apple Inc.) in 1991 to showcase advanced type technologies. Intended as a versatile font suitable for body text, it takes cues from designs by Miklós Kis and Jean Jannon.

A version of Hoefler Text has been included with every version of the classic Mac OS since System 7.5 and in every version of macOS. Hoefler's company, Hoefler & Co., has continued development of the typeface, developing a range of additional variants for sale.

Released free with every Mac during the growth of desktop publishing, at a time when producing printed documents was becoming dramatically easier, Hoefler Text raised awareness of type features previously the concern only of professional printers. In 2014, New York magazine commented that Hoefler Text "helped launch a thousand font obsessives." Hoefler Text was used in the Wikipedia logo until the 2010 redesign, when it was replaced with Linux Libertine.

== Features ==
Hoefler Text incorporates then-advanced features which have since become standard practice for font designers, such as automatic ligature insertion, real small capitals, optional old style figures and optional insertion of characters such as true superscript and subscript characters, the historical round and long s, engraved capitals and swashes. Hoefler Text also has a matching ornament font containing arabesque motifs. It was, until OpenType made alternate characters more common, one of only a few system fonts that contained old style, or ranging, figures, which are designed to harmonize with body text.

Hoefler & Co. expanded Hoefler Text to include additional typographic features. The current commercial release now includes three weights (an additional bold weight beside the regular and black included with Macs) and two sets of engraved capitals, as well as the more slender display variant Hoefler Titling. These are released in the OpenType format, intended for cross-platform usage.

The design is based on the typefaces Janson and Garamond No. 3, both of whose historical names are misattributions; the designs were created by punchcutters Miklós Tótfalusi Kis and Jean Jannon, respectively.

=== Gallery ===
Hoefler Text features in the version bundled with Macs. The commercial release includes an additional bold weight (less bold than that shown) and a second, lighter design of engraved capitals.

Contextual and selectable ligatures in Hoefler Text, highlighted in red

== See also ==
- Apple Advanced Typography
