= Whitney (typeface) =

Sans-serif typeface

- Category: Sans-serif
- Classification: Neo-grotesque; humanist
- Designer: Tobias Frere-Jones
- Commissioned by: Whitney Museum
- Foundry: Hoefler & Co.
- Date created: 2004
- Website: typography.com/fonts/whitney

Whitney is a family of humanist sans-serif digital typefaces, designed by American type designer Tobias Frere-Jones. It was originally created for New York's Whitney Museum as its institutional typeface. Two key requirements were flexibility for editorial requirements and a design consistency with the Whitney Museum's existing public signage.

== Typographical context ==
Whitney was created in 2004 by the foundry of Hoefler & Frere-Jones. Whitney bridges the divide between editorial mainstays such as News Gothic (1908), which is an American gothic typeface, and signage application standards such as Frutiger (1975), which is a European humanist typeface. Moreover, "its compact forms and broad x-height use space efficiently, and its ample counters and open shapes make it clear under any circumstances."

== Variants ==
- Whitney Light
- Whitney Light Italic
- Whitney Book
- Whitney Book Italic
- Whitney Medium
- Whitney Medium Italic
- Whitney Semibold
- Whitney Semibold Italic
- Whitney Bold
- Whitney Bold Italic
- Whitney Black
- Whitney Black Italic
