= Cyrus Highsmith =

American type designer

Cyrus Highsmith (born 1973) is an American typeface designer, illustrator, and author.

After graduating from the Rhode Island School of Design in 1997, he worked at Font Bureau in Boston as Senior Type Designer until founding his own type foundry, Occupant Fonts, in 2016, distributing alongside his former employers via the Type Network service.

Some of Highsmith’s most well-known typefaces are Zócalo, used by the Mexican daily El Universal, and the Antenna series, which was used in several magazine designs as well as by Ford and the official Star Wars website. Other clients for custom fonts include or have included The Wall Street Journal, Martha Stewart Living, La Prensa Gráfica of El Salvador, ESPN, and Men’s Health. His typefaces Prensa and Relay won the 2001 Bukvaːraz! award, organized by ATypI (the International Typographic Association) in 2001. In 2015, Cyrus Highsmith received the Gerrit Noordzij Prize by the Royal Academy of Art, The Hague.

In addition to typeface design, Highsmith has been teaching at his alma mater, the Rhode Island School of Design, since 2000, while also lecturing and taking part in juries in North America, Japan and across Europe. He is the author of Inside Paragraphs: Typographic Fundamentals published by Font Bureau in 2012. With his own imprint, Occupant Press, he publishes children’s books and other prints. In 2016, Highsmith founded Occupant Fonts in Providence, Rhode Island, which continues to publish his typefaces designed while at Font Bureau as well as new releases.

In September 2017, it was announced that Occupant Fonts had been acquired by the Japanese type foundry Morisawa and thenceforth functioned as their Providence drawing office, with Highsmith as its creative director, overseeing RISD graduates June Shin, Marie Otsuka and Cem Eskinazi. The first two releases in cooperation with Morisawa are Citrine and the Latin-character range of A1 Gothic (both derived from his typeface Allium), published that same year.

== List of typefaces ==
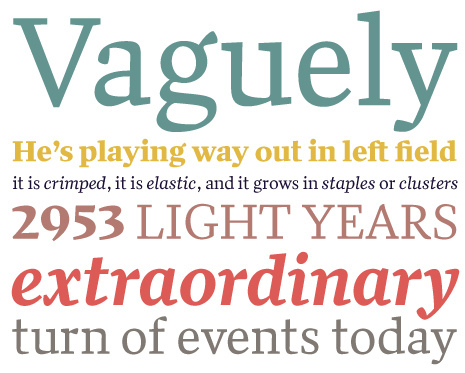
A FontShop specimen image of Highsmith's Quiosco. It was inspired by the approach of type designer William Addison Dwiggins in creating an obvious difference between the curve shapes on the outside and inside of the letterforms.

- Allium
  - Citrine (for Morisawa)
  - A1 Gothic (latin-character range; for Morisawa)
- Amira
- Antenna
- Antenna Serif
- Benton Sans
- Biscotti
- Bureau Roman
- Caslon’s Egyptian
- CySans
- Daley’s Gothic
- Dispatch
- Eggwhite
- Escrow
- Gasket
- Heron Sans
- Heron Serif
- Ibis
- Icebox
- Loupot
- Magmatic (with June Shin)
- Miller Headline
- Novia
- Occupant Gothic
- Prensa
- Quiosco
  - Quiosco Display (with Cem Eskinazi)
- Relay
- Salvo Sans
- Salvo Serif
- Scout
- Serge
- Stainless
- Tick
- Tock
- Zócalo

== Books ==
=== Text and illustrations ===
- Highsmith, Cyrus, & Occupant Fonts staff. How to Speak Rooster. Providence (Rhode Island): Occupant Fonts, 2018. ISBN 978-0-9898333-1-8
- Inside Paragraphs: Typographic Fundamentals (Revised Edition). Princeton Architectural Press, 2020. ISBN 978-1-61689-941-7
- Apple Bear Cat. Providence (Rhode Island): Occupant Press, 2013.
- Inside Paragraphs: Typographic Fundamentals. Boston: Font Bureau, 2012. ISBN 978-0-9654-7220-3

=== Illustrations/Picture book ===
- Ari Inu Usagi (Ant, Dog, Rabbit – a Japanese alphabet book). Tokyo): Bunkeido, 2016. ISBN 978-4-7999-0167-0 https://common.bunkei.co.jp/books/2991.html
- Ikko Ni-hon San-biki (One Apple, Two Tulips, Three Rabbits — a book of Japanese counter words). Tokyo: Bunkeido, 2017. ISBN 978-4-7999-0224-0 https://common.bunkei.co.jp/books/2955.html
- Apple Bear Cat (' — a book of ABC words). Tokyo: Bunkeido, 2014. ISBN 978-4-7999-0071-0 https://common.bunkei.co.jp/books/3062.html

=== About ===
- KABK, ed. Products of a Thinking Hand (Gerrit Noordzij Prize exhibition book). The Hague: Uitgeverij de Buitenkant, 2018. ISBN 978-9-4909-1382-3
