= Font Bureau =

American digital type foundry (1989–2024)

Coordinates: 42°21′1.1″N 71°3′27.5″W

The Font Bureau, Inc.
- Type: Private
- Industry: Type foundry
- Founded: 1989
- Founder: Roger Black (co-founder and consultant); David Berlow (co-founder and designer)
- Headquarters: Boston, Massachusetts
- Products: Agency FB; Benton Sans; Charcoal; Interstate; Miller; Tasse
- Website: Archived website

The Font Bureau, Inc. or Font Bureau is a digital type foundry based in Boston, Massachusetts, United States. The foundry was one of the leading designers of typefaces, specializing in type designs for magazine and newspaper publishers.

== History ==
Font Bureau was founded in 1989 by Roger Black and David Berlow. Before founding Font Bureau, Roger Black was an established publications designer and consultant. David Berlow is a noted type designer. The New York Times Magazine, Newsweek, Esquire Magazine, Rolling Stone and the Wall Street Journal rank among Font Bureau's client list. Apart from Black and Berlow, other prominent designers at Font Bureau have included Tobias Frere-Jones, later of Hoefler & Frere-Jones and Frere-Jones Type, and Cyrus Highsmith, later of Occupant Fonts and Morisawa. Matthew Carter has been a frequent collaborator with the foundry.

In October 2009, news sources reported that Font Bureau was "suing NBC Universal for at least $2 million over the entertainment company's use of its fonts." Font Bureau claimed NBC broke its license agreement in its use of the fonts Antenna, Bureau Grotesque and Interstate in marketing material.

Following the launch of TypeNetwork in 2016, Font Bureau foundry would begin to focus primarily on type design and custom services, while the company's font licensing business, font development activities, and retail shop would be relocated to TypeNetwork.

On July 6, 2016, The Font Bureau, Inc. announced all its retail typefaces are sold exclusively at TypeNetwork, withdrawing sales in Fonts.com, MyFonts, FontShop.

Font Bureau withdrew their fonts from the Adobe Fonts library on June 15, 2020.

On May 4, 2023, Monotype Corporation acquired 39 typefaces from the Font Bureau library including Agency FB and Benton Sans.

On July 1, 2024, Monotype Corporation removed its Font Bureau typefaces from Type Network, choosing to distribute them exclusively.

The company is currently involved in advanced type, technologies and design centered around OpenType Variable fonts including Google Sans Flex, Roboto Flex and Amstelvar.

== Typefaces ==
The following foundry types were issued by Font Foundry:

- Agency FB
- Benton Sans (1995, Tobias Frere-Jones)
- Charcoal (1994–1997, David Berlow)
- Interstate
- Miller
- Tasse
- Constructa
- Eagle
- Beijing SSI
- Harrington
- Niagara
- Prelude
- Ravie

== See also ==
- List of Apple typefaces
- Typography of Apple Inc.
