= Tobias Frere-Jones =

American type designer (born 1970)

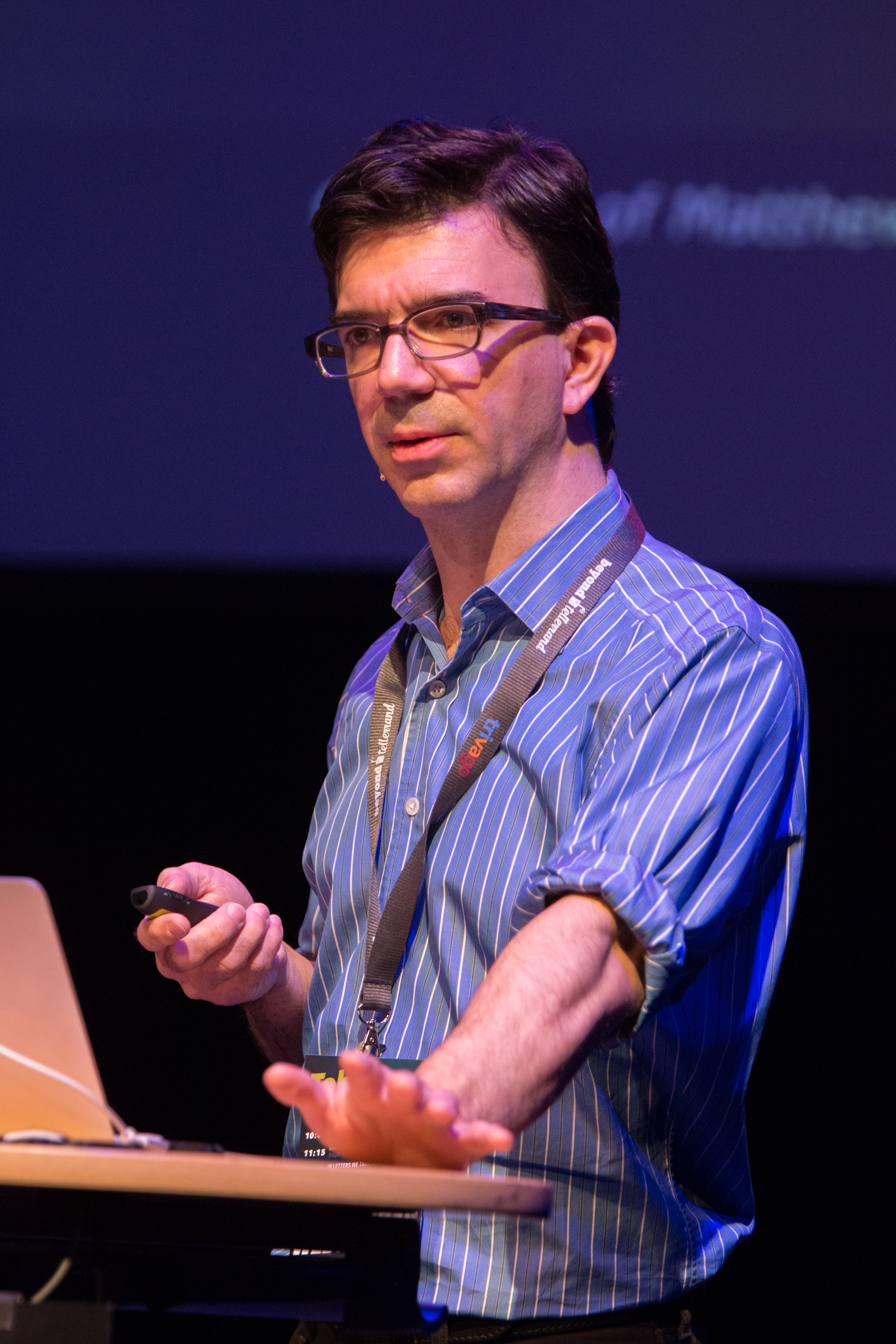
- Frere-Jones in 2015
- Born: Tobias Edgar Mallory Jones; August 28, 1970 (age 56); New York City, New York, US
- Occupation: Type designer
- Employers: Font Bureau; Hoefler & Frere-Jones; Frere-Jones Type
- Notable work: Gotham; Archer; Whitney
- Spouse: Christine Annabelle Bateup (m. 2006)

Tobias Frere-Jones (born Tobias Edgar Mallory Jones, August 28, 1970) is an American type designer who works in New York City. He operates the company Frere-Jones Type and teaches typeface design at the Yale School of Art MFA program.

Among his typefaces are Gotham which was used by the Obama 2008 presidential campaign, and Archer which has been used by Martha Stewart Living and Wells Fargo.

== Career ==
Frere-Jones grew up in Brooklyn and became interested in letter design while attending Saint Ann's School. He is a son of Robin Carpenter Jones, who wrote for advertising agencies, and his British wife, the former Elizabeth Frere, daughter of Alexander Stuart Frere. His brother is music critic Sasha Frere-Jones and his great-grandfather was writer Edgar Wallace.

After receiving a BFA in 1992 from Rhode Island School of Design, Frere-Jones joined Font Bureau in Boston, becoming Senior Designer. He created a number of the typefaces that are Font Bureau's best known, among them Interstate. He joined the Yale School of Art faculty in 1996, and teaches type design there alongside Matthew Carter and Nina Stössinger.

In 1999, he left Font Bureau to return to New York, where he began working with the company of Jonathan Hoefler, renamed Hoefler & Frere-Jones in 2005. While working together, the two collaborated on projects for The Wall Street Journal, Martha Stewart Living, Nike, Pentagram, GQ, Esquire, The New Times, Business 2.0, and The New York Times Magazine. In 2014 Frere-Jones ended his work with Hoefler and filed a lawsuit against him which was resolved in an out-of-court settlement later that year. He then established his own company, Frere-Jones Type, which released its first retail family, Mallory, in 2015.

In 2006, Frere-Jones received the Gerrit Noordzij Prize, an award given by the Royal Academy of Art (The Hague) to honor innovations in type design. In 2013 he received the AIGA Medal and won the National Design Award for Communication Design from the Cooper Hewitt, Smithsonian Design Museum in 2019.

Frere-Jones married Christine Annabelle Bateup in 2006.

== Typeface design ==
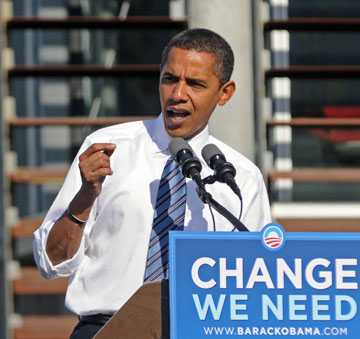
Frere-Jones' typeface Gotham became well known for use by the Obama 2008 presidential campaign.

Several of Frere-Jones' best-known typefaces were designed for Martha Stewart Living.

Several of Frere-Jones' designs in the 1990s, notably Reactor, were highly expressive in the "grunge typography" style of the period; some were created for Neville Brody. However, he commented in a 1994 article that "grunge has firmly dated itself and many are already tired of it." A 2012 review by Christopher Hamamoto described Frere-Jones' later work as generally based on "formality and practicality", and a Businessweek article commented that Frere-Jones' later type design generally preferred "a cleaner style based on historic typefaces". Frere-Jones' popular font family Gotham was based on lettering on New York public buildings, and his later sans-serif family Mallory was intended to be conceptually "autobiographical", referring to his British family and intended to amalgamate characteristics of British and American typography.

In a podcast interview, Frere-Jones described his order of work:

I think of a typeface's design as being less about the specific letters. It doesn't begin with thinking that the bowl on the lower-case 'g' ought to look like this, or the tail on the 'q' ought to do this…it's more about the theme that runs through all these shapes, the kind of strategy that helps them work with one another…I think secondly, for a typeface designer the alphabet is not a linear sequence…it's a bunch of, almost like little tribes of, like-minded things...the first three letters that we often draw are the capital 'H', as a representative from the camp of square things, the capital 'O', as obviously something round, and then the capital 'D', as something that's a kind of hybrid form. And just in those three letters there are all kinds of decisions to make about how heavy things are, how much contrast they have and the difference between heavy and light within a single shape, how wide they are. If there are serifs in there, what kind of shape and length that they have, and also how much space is allotted to each side of these shapes. Because that's a really critical part of making a typeface work, is not just drawing the shapes but drawing and designing the space in between the shapes, and also inside them.

So it's not uncommon to spend the whole day or several days on just these first three letters and to come back to these first three letters and try something differently and see what the implications are. That would often be followed by a corresponding trio of letters in the lower-case…'n', 'o' and 'p', the same idea of something square, something round, something mixed. And after those three get coordinated with each other, it's then time to get the caps to work in some consistent way with the lower-case…and then from there I build out the character sets on the lines of these initial camps of square and round and diagonal…I try to get onscreen as soon as possible because so much of the strategy and so much of the success of the design is in how successfully these shapes can combine with one another, and if they're digital I can rearrange these shapes in any order.

Many of Frere-Jones' typefaces are extremely large families designed for professional users, for instance Mallory which as of 2019 had 110 styles. Organisations that commissioned work from Frere-Jones have included GQ magazine, the Whitney Museum, The Wall Street Journal, Martha Stewart Living and the Essex Market. In 2014 German type designer Erik Spiekermann, who published Frere-Jones' first typeface, described him as "one of the two or three best type designers in the world".

== Typefaces ==
Tobias Frere-Jones' typefaces include:

- Armada, 1987–94
- Dolores, 1990
- Hightower Text
- Nobel, 1991–93
- Garage Gothic, 1992
- Cassandra, 1992
- Pythagoras, 1992
- Proxy, 1992
- Zoetrope, 1992
- Horizon, 1992
- Archipelago, 1992–98
- Vitriol, 1992–94
- Cafeteria, 1993
- Epitaph, 1993
- Nixie, 1993
- Reiner Script, 1993
- Stereo, 1993
- Chainletter, 1993–94
- Reactor, 1993–96
- Interstate, 1993–99
- Fibonacci, 1994
- Sum Of The Parts, 1994
- Rietveld, 1994
- Supermodel, 1994
- Niagara, 1994
- Asphalt, 1995
- Benton Gothic, 1995
- Citadel, 1995
- Microphone, 1995
- Pilsner, 1995
- Poynter Oldstyle, 1996–97
- Poynter Gothic, 1997
- Griffith Gothic, 1997–2000
- Whitney, 1996–2004
- Benton Modern (with David Berlow), 1997–2015
- Numbers (with Jonathan Hoefler), 1997–2006
- Phemister, 1997
- Grand Central, 1998
- Welo Script, 1998
- Mercury Text (with Jonathan Hoefler), 1999
- Vitesse (with Jonathan Hoefler), 2000
- Landmark (with Jonathan Hoefler), 2000–12
- Evolution (with Jonathan Hoefler), 2000
- Retina, 2000–16
- Nitro, 2001
- Surveyor, 2001
- Archer (with Jonathan Hoefler), 2001
- Gotham, 2000–09
- Idlewild, 2002–12
- Exchange, 2002–17
- Monarch, 2003
- Dulcet, 2003
- Tungsten, 2004–12
- Argosy, 2004
- Gotham Rounded, 2005
- Mallory, 2015
- Conductor (designed with Nina Stössinger), 2018
- Empirica (designed with Nina Stössinger), 1994–2018
- Seaford, 2019–21 (designed with Nina Stössinger and Fred Shallcrass)
- Community Gothic (designed with Fred Shallcrass and Nina Stössinger), 1997–2022
- Supermassive (designed with Fred Shallcrass, Nina Stössinger, and Rosie Mai), 2019–2024
- Edgar (designed with Nina Stössinger, Hrvoje Živčić, and Fred Shallcrass), 2014–2025
