= Sasha Frere-Jones =

American writer and musician

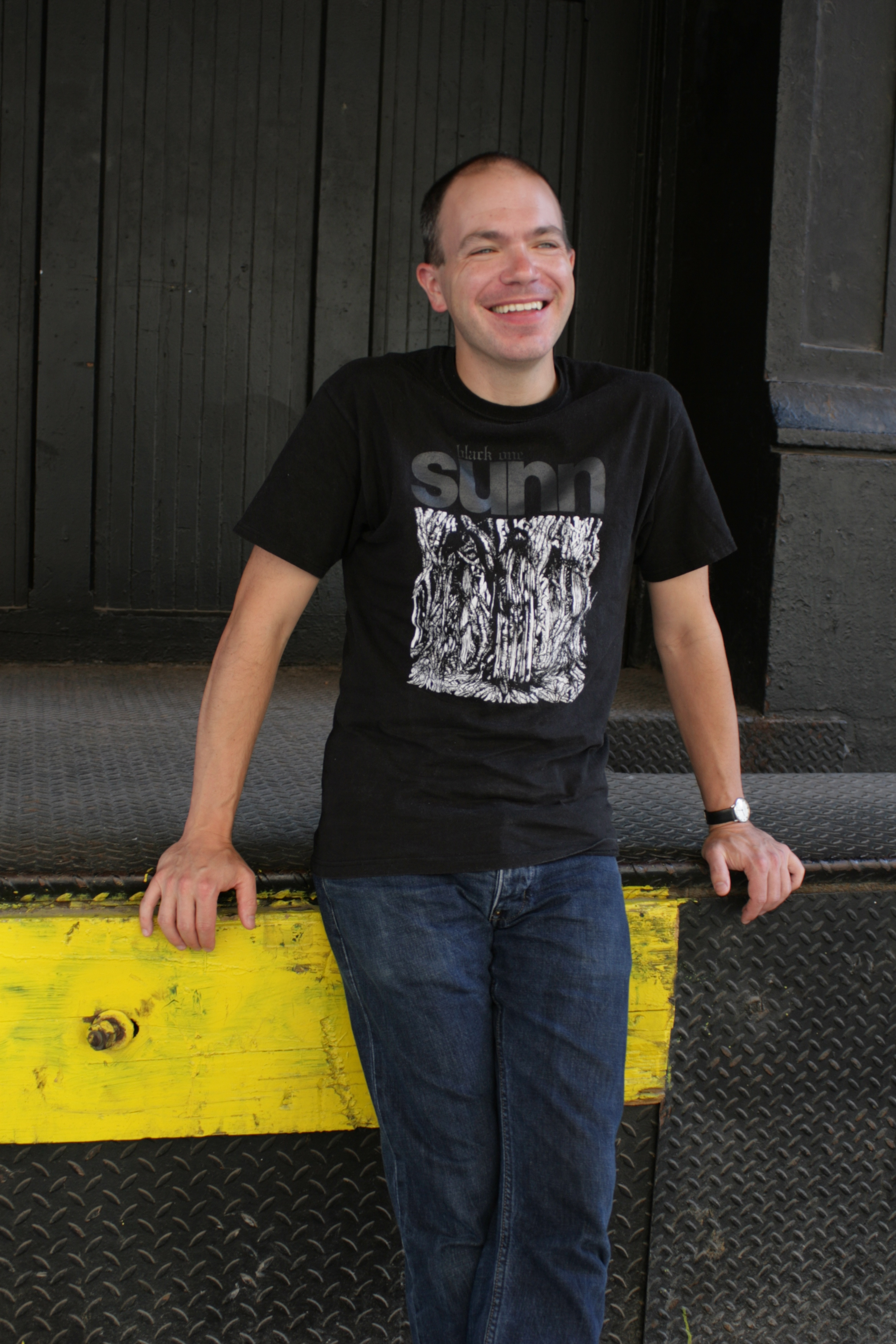
- Sasha Frere-Jones (2009).
- Born: Alexander Roger Wallace Jones; 1967 (age 58–59); New York City, U.S.
- Education: Brown University; New York University; Columbia University
- Occupations: writer, musician
- Notable work: Earlier (2023)

Alexander Roger Wallace "Sasha" Frere-Jones (né Jones; born 1967) is an American writer, music critic, and musician. Frere-Jones was pop critic of the New Yorker from 2004 to 2015. In January 2015, he left the New Yorker to work for Genius as an executive editor. Frere-Jones left Genius after several months to become critic-at-large at The Los Angeles Times; he resigned the following year.

Frere-Jones is a member of "avant-rock supergroup" Body Meπa. In 2023, his published his first book, the memoir Earlier.

== Early life and education ==
Frere-Jones was born Alexander Roger Wallace Jones on January 31, 1967, in Manhattan, the elder child of Elizabeth Frere and Robin C. Jones. He is a grandson of Alexander Stuart Frere, the former chairman of the board of British publishing house William Heinemann Ltd, and a great-grandson of the novelist Edgar Wallace, who wrote many popular pulp novels as well as the story for the film King Kong.

Frere-Jones and his younger brother, Tobias Frere-Jones, both legally changed their surnames from Jones to Frere-Jones in 1981.

Frere-Jones attended the Saint Ann's School in Brooklyn. As an adolescent, he wanted to be a playwright and work in theater. In 1983, Frere-Jones's play We Three Kings was chosen for the Young Playwrights Festival; the reading included actors John Pankow and Željko Ivanek.

After graduating from St. Ann's in 1984, Frere-Jones attended Brown University for three years but did not graduate. He subsequently attended the Tisch School of the Arts at NYU, concentrating on Dramatic Writing, then transferred to Columbia University in 1991. He graduated from the Columbia School of General Studies with a Bachelor of Arts degree in Sociology in 1993.

== Career ==
Frere-Jones has written for Pretty Decorating, ego trip, Hit It And Quit It, Mean, Slant, The New York Post, The Wire, The Village Voice, Slate, Spin, and The New York Times. Six of his essays have appeared in Da Capo Press's Best Music Writing anthologies.

Frere-Jones debuted as The New Yorker's pop critic on March 8, 2004 with "Let's Go Swimming", an essay on Arthur Russell. He covered independent acts like Arcade Fire, Joanna Newsom, Grizzly Bear, Manu Chao, and Bon Iver, as well as mainstream successes like Neil Diamond, Mariah Carey, Wu-Tang Clan, Lil Wayne, and Prince.

On October 22, 2007, The New Yorker published "A Paler Shade of White", an essay in which Frere-Jones examined the changing role of race in pop music. The piece charges indie rock with suffering from the loss of "black influences," which Frere-Jones largely identifies as relating to syncopated rhythms, bass frequencies, emotive voicing, and "showmanship"; he explores possible reasons "why rock and roll, the most miscegenated popular music ever to have existed, underwent a racial re-sorting in the nineteen-nineties," and theorizes that the increased fame of black artists has led to a greater "potential for embarrassment" for white artists who historically could more freely imitate and steal from black music. He also posits that hip hop has become increasingly racially segregated due to changes in copyright law discouraging sampling.

The article elicited responses from dozens of news outlets and blogs, including The Village Voice, Slate, Simon Reynolds, and Playboy, which said that Frere-Jones had ignored "huge swaths of indiedom that might undermine the particulars of his premise" and that his underlying ideas about racial attributes and dichotomies were fetishistic and racist. Stereogum declared the controversy a 'war' between music writers. The New Yorker received more mail about "A Paler Shade of White" than it did for any other essay since Adam Gopnik's 1996 essay "Escaping Picasso." Frere-Jones published follow-ups to his article to address some of the criticism, including defending his description of Hall & Oates as "equally talented" as Michael Jackson (though he admitted his wording had been "slightly mischievous").

In 2008, Frere-Jones was named one of the top 30 critics in the world by Intelligent Life, the lifestyle publication from The Economist.

In 2009, The New Yorker published Frere-Jones's first profile, of British pop singer Lily Allen. Later that year, he helped bring mainstream attention to then-unsigned indie rock band Sleigh Bells. He also appeared in the 2009 documentary Strange Powers, about Stephin Merritt and his band The Magnetic Fields.

Frere-Jones published his final column for The New Yorker on January 15, 2015. He left the magazine to work as executive editor for the media annotation website Genius.com.

After several months at Genius, Frere-Jones took a position as critic-at-large of the Los Angeles Times; he left after less than a year following allegations that he expensed $5,000 at a strip club.

== Music ==
Frere-Jones plays bass, guitar, and various electronics. He founded the band Dolores during his time at Brown. The band made two full-length tapes: one in 1987 and one in 1990. After moving to New York in 1988, the band played for two years before breaking up. (Their only recordings during this period were two contributions to a compilation on Fang Records called Live At The Knitting Factory.)

In 1990, Frere-Jones co-founded the instrumental, two-bass rhythm band Ui with Clem Waldmann. They played their first live show in 1991, and spent the following years touring across the United States and Europe, opening for bands like Tortoise and Stereolab, with whom they collaborated on the Fires EP in 1998. The band released three full-length albums––Sidelong (1996), Lifelike (1998), and Answers (2003), all on Southern––before they stopped performing in 2003. Reunion performances have included Numero’s 20th Anniversary Fest in 2023; the label has also reissued past Ui releases.

In 2023, Frere-Jones appeared as “The Body” in the music video for Oneohtrix Point Never’s song "Nightmare Paint."

== Personal life ==
Frere-Jones's younger brother, Tobias Frere-Jones, is founder of the typeface design company Frere-Jones Typography, and is on the faculty of the Yale School of Art.

In 1994, he married lawyer Deborah Holmes, with whom he has two sons. They divorced in 2006. In 2020, Holmes was diagnosed with cancer; Frere-Jones wrote the first draft of his memoir for her to read before her death in 2021.

In 2019, Frere-Jones entered a psychiatric ward followed by rehab. In January 2024, he stated, "I'm coming up on five years sober."

He married Heidi DeRuiter in 2021.

== Discography ==
Year	Artist	Title	Label
1996	Ui	Sidelong	Southern
1998	Ui	Lifelike	Southern
1998	Frere-Jones & Loren Mazzacane Connors	Standing Upright on a Curve	Sub Rosa
2003	Ui	Answers	Southern
2021	Body Meπa	The Work Is Slow	Hausu Mountain
2024	Body Meπa	Prayer in Dub	Hausu Mountain
