= Roger Black (graphic designer) =

American graphic designer (born 1948)

Roger David Black
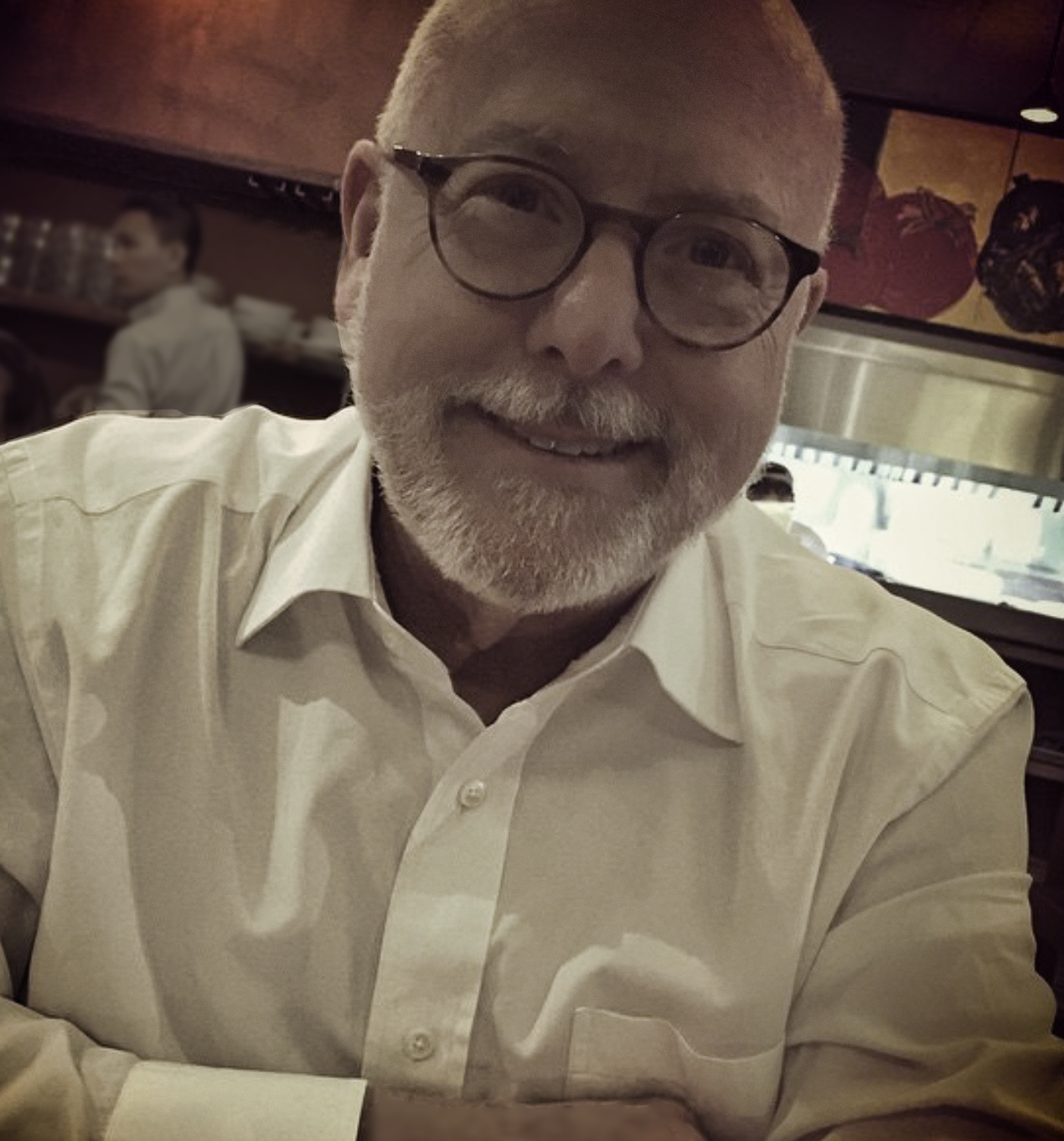
- Roger Black (2015)
- Born: August 18, 1948 (age 78); Austin, Texas, U.S.
- Education: University of Chicago (Political Science, 1970)
- Occupation: Graphic designer
- Website: www.rogerblack.com

Roger Black (born August 18, 1948) is an American graphic designer whose work has been influential in the design of magazines, newspapers, digital typography and the web. His contributions include designs for Rolling Stone, Esquire, The New Republic, Fast Company, Reader's Digest, Foreign Affairs, the Los Angeles Times, the Houston Chronicle and the website Bloomberg.com.

== Early life ==
Roger Black was born in Austin, Texas, to Eleanor Fox Black and J. J. Black, an architect who built more than 200 homes in Midland, Texas and several buildings in New York. His mother, Eleanor, worked in the business department of The New York Times in the mid-1920s and left to work at The American Mercury, a magazine published in the Roaring Twenties. Black attended Deerfield Academy boarding school in Massachusetts.

== Early career ==
Roger Black's first position as a publication art director was at the alternative weekly LA, edited by Karl Fleming and funded by Max Palevsky.

== Rolling Stone magazine ==
Black was hired at Rolling Stone magazine as an associate art director in May 1975 and a year later became the top art director in 1976. He undertook a complete redesign in 1977, coinciding with the magazine's tenth anniversary and transition from a pulp publication to a slick magazine.

== Magazines and Newspapers ==
He left in 1978 and became a design director for New York and New West magazines and for Los Angeles magazine from 1978 to 1981. He worked as art director for The New York Times Magazine from 1982 to 1984 and was promoted to director of editorial art for The New York Times in 1984. In 1982 he helped launch Out magazine with Michael Goff. In 1985, he became art director for Newsweek magazine, followed by Smart Magazine (1988–1990) and Esquire magazine (1993). During this period he also oversaw design for the launches of Fast Company and Smart Money magazines, redesigned the San Francisco Examiner and consulted with weekly publisher Metro Newspapers.

In 1995, he designed John F. Kennedy Jr.’s George magazine.

“He has designed more magazines than anybody else,” New York magazine writer Michael Wolff wrote in 1999. “Roger has created a standard. Using a Macintosh, he has become the Windows of print.”

== Other Ventures ==
Black incorporated the design consultancy Roger Black, Inc. in the 1980s and has worked for publishing and corporate clients internationally. Black was an early adopter of desktop publishing and subsequently, the World Wide Web, designing sites for MSNBC, the Discovery Channel, and drugstore.com in the mid-90s.

In 1989, he co-founded the Font Bureau with typographer David Berlow and became an early pioneer in digital typography. With Terry McDonell, Black launched Outside magazine while at Rolling Stone. Roger also created the first all-desktop-published magazine, Smart, backed by publishing entrepreneur Owen Lipstein.

In 1993, Black co-founded the international design firm Danilo Black with Eduardo Danilo, which was incorporated in 2001 as Danilo Black Inc.

He moved to Silicon Valley for several years in the mid-1990s and was a member of the founding team of the high-speed cable Internet service provider @Home Network, where he designed the interface of its portal.

In the late 1990s and early 2000s, Black served as chief creative officer of the Web solutions provider Circle.com, overseeing a creative team of 200 designers.

Black serves as a director of Type Network, a typography licensing firm, founded in 2016.

== Awards and honors ==
Black won the Society for News Design’s Lifetime Achievement Award. Fellow designer, Mario Garcia, stated about Black, “Roger Black is one of our industry’s titans, a visionary and one who has made golden and elegant any project he has ever touched. He is a perfectionist and [a] seeker of excellence.”

== Works ==
Roger Black's Desktop Design Power (1991, Bantam Books) Google Books

Web Sites that Work (1997, Adobe Press, with Sean Elder) Google Books
