= Hoefler & Co. =

American type foundry

- Formerly: Hoefler Type Foundry; Hoefler & Frere-Jones
- Industry: Graphic design
- Genre: Typeface design
- Founded: 1989; 37 years ago in New York City
- Founder: Jonathan Hoefler
- Headquarters: Woburn, Massachusetts, US
- Key people: Carleen Borsella (formerly); Tobias Frere-Jones (formerly); Sara Soskolne; Andy Clymer (formerly)
- Products: Archer; Gotham; Hoefler Text; Requiem; Surveyor; Whitney
- Parent: Monotype Imaging
- Website: typography.com

Hoefler & Co. (H&Co; stylized as Hoefler&Co.) is an American digital type foundry in Woburn, Massachusetts, founded by type designer Jonathan Hoefler. The company designs typefaces for clients and for retail on its website.

The company was founded in New York City in 1989, initially focusing on editorial commissions for publications such as The New York Times, Martha Stewart Living, The Wall Street Journal, Esquire, Rolling Stone, Sports Illustrated, Harper's Bazaar, Wired and Condé Nast Portfolio, and commissions for companies such as Tiffany & Co., Nike, and Hewlett-Packard. It has worked with a number of prominent cultural institutions in New York City, including the headquarters of the United Nations, the Guggenheim Museum, the Whitney Museum, Lever House, Radio City Music Hall, the Public Theater, and the New York Jets. Because of its inspiration from New York City history, its Gotham typeface was selected in 2004 for the cornerstone of One World Trade Center, built on the World Trade Center site.

Previously incorporated as The Hoefler Type Foundry (HTF), and then rebranded as Hoefler & Frere-Jones (H&FJ) in 2005.

In September 2021 Hoefler & Co. was sold to Monotype. The sale led to Monotype acquiring the intellectual property rights to the foundry’s entire library of typefaces, their website Typography.com, and entire staff, with exception of founder Jonathan Hoefler and CEO Carleen Borsella, who agreed to step aside as part of the deal.

== Work ==
The company's family Hoefler Text, showing its large range of features. New York magazine commented in 2014 that the version of Hoefler Text bundled with the Mac operating system "helped launch a thousand font obsessives."

The company specializes in designing original typefaces, often comprehensive type families that include a range of styles or characters: its Gotham typeface for GQ extends to 74 for print alone, and its Surveyor/Obsidian family past 100. Many H&Co typefaces take inspiration from historical models, and under-examined aspects of typography and lettering, such as Soviet house numbers, metal lettering on bus terminals, engraved maps, and old petrol pumps. Bloomberg Businessweek commented that Hoefler and Frere-Jones bonded over a dislike of "so-called grunge typography, which trafficked in angst and messiness. Neither Frere-Jones nor Hoefler took to that trend, preferring a cleaner style based on historic typefaces."

The company's work has been profiled in The New York Times, Time, Esquire, Wallpaper, and Wired, as well as the design publications Baseline, CAP & Design, CreativePro, Communication Arts, Desktop , Eye, Design, Graphis Inc., I.D., IDEA, IdN, Metropolis, Page, Print, Publish, and +81. H&Co's work is part of the permanent collections of both the Smithsonian Institution and the Victoria & Albert Museum, and it has been recognized by the American Institute of Graphic Arts and the National Design Awards.

== Notable uses ==
The Gotham typeface became famous during 2008, when it was chosen for the identity of Barack Obama during his campaign for the presidency. The Ringside typeface was used in the Elizabeth Warren 2020 presidential campaign and the Mercury and Decimal typefaces were used in the Joe Biden 2020 presidential campaign as well as during the Presidency of Joe Biden (2020-2025). Ideal Sans was chosen for the identity system of the New Zealand Government in 2021.

H&Co typefaces associated with cultural institutions include Knockout (for the Public Theater), Ideal Sans (the Art Institute of Chicago), Verlag (the Guggenheim Museum) and Whitney (the Whitney Museum). H&Co's Ringside typeface is the official typeface of the Office of Barack and Michelle Obama.

== Awards ==
Jonathan Hoefler was the recipient of the 2002 Prix Charles Peignot, awarded by the Association Typographique Internationale (ATypI) for outstanding contributions to typeface design. In 2009, the company became the first typeface designers to be recognized by the National Design Awards.

== Conflict between Hoefler and Frere-Jones ==
On January 16, 2014, designer Tobias Frere-Jones, who had worked with the company since 1999, filed a lawsuit in the courts of New York state against Jonathan Hoefler. The lawsuit alleged that Frere-Jones was entitled to own half of the type foundry, based on an oral agreement made in 1999. According to this alleged agreement, Frere-Jones transferred ownership of his fonts to the company for 10 USD and the company was renamed Hoefler & Frere-Jones. Frere-Jones contends that the foundry was intended to be run as an equal partnership. Hoefler filed a motion to dismiss, refuting Frere-Jones's account by attaching the written agreement signed by himself and Frere-Jones. The lawsuit was settled on September 28, 2014, its terms undisclosed.

== List of typefaces ==
- Archer
- Champion Gothic
- Decimal
- Gotham
- Hoefler Text and display variant Hoefler Titling
- Inkwell
- Obsidian
- Operator
- Quarto
- Requiem
- Surveyor
- Verlag
- Whitney
