= News Gothic =

Grotesque sans-serif typeface

- Category: Sans-serif
- Classification: Grotesque
- Designer: Morris Fuller Benton
- Foundry: American Type Founders
- Date created: 1908

News Gothic is a sans-serif typeface designed by Morris Fuller Benton and released in 1908 by his employer American Type Founders (ATF). The typeface is similar in proportion and structure to Franklin Gothic, also designed by Benton, but lighter.

News Gothic, like other Benton sans serif typefaces, follows the grotesque model, resembling serif text faces of the period, with a double-story lower-case "a" and "g". Also distinctive are the blunt terminus at the apex of the lowercase "t", and the location of the tail of the uppercase "Q" completely outside the bowl. The letterforms are compact, and descenders are shallow. The typeface differs from other grotesque sans-serifs in its rather light weight and open letterforms, contributing to a less severe, humanist tone of voice.

For much of the twentieth century, News Gothic was used in newspaper and magazine publishing with copies available on Monotype and Intertype machines for hot metal typesetting; both companies added additional weights to the family. For use in headlines, it was designed with condensed and extra condensed styles.

"Gothic" was an early twentieth century term for sans-serifs, found mostly in the United States and Canada. It was also used in the United Kingdom, along with "grotesque". In Germany, the term "grotesk" was used.

== Metal type release ==
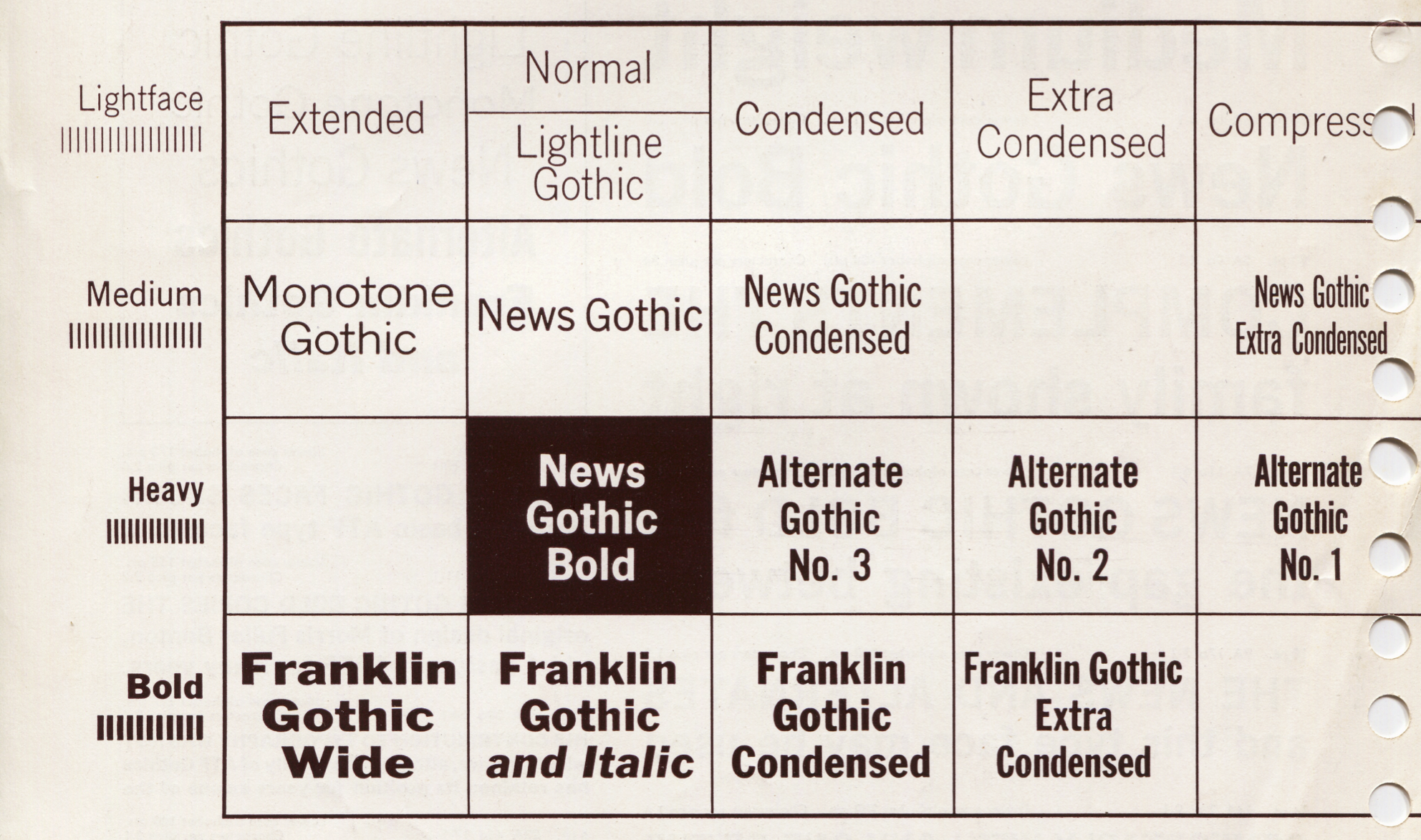
A post-war guide (presumably c. 1958) explaining the names used by ATF for their many somewhat related "gothic" types and highlighting their then-new News Gothic Bold

Benton's autobiographical notes list the following designs as his contributions to the family:

- News Gothic
- News Gothic Condensed
- News Gothic Extra Condensed

ATF's 1923 specimen book also shows:

- News Gothic Extra Condensed Title (a headline face)

As with Franklin Gothic, the foundry expanded the line sometime later, adding two more variants:

- News Gothic Bold (1958), designed by John L. "Bud" Renshaw; however, Intertype had already released a bold News Gothic in a hot metal typesetting version, as did Monotype later on.
- News Gothic Condensed Bold (1965), designed by Frank Bartuska; versions also by Monotype and Intertype

Both Monotype and Intertype released oblique versions; McGrew reports that, while ATF's archives contained 1912 production drawings for an oblique, "we have no record of its production".

=== Cold type copies ===
Virtually all producers of cold type offered their own versions of News Gothic under different names:

- News Gothic — Alphatype, Autologic, Berthold, Compugraphic, Dymo, Harris, MGD Graphic Systems, Monotype, Varityper
- Gothstar Trade — Star/Photon
- Toledo — Graphic Systems Inc.

== Digital releases ==
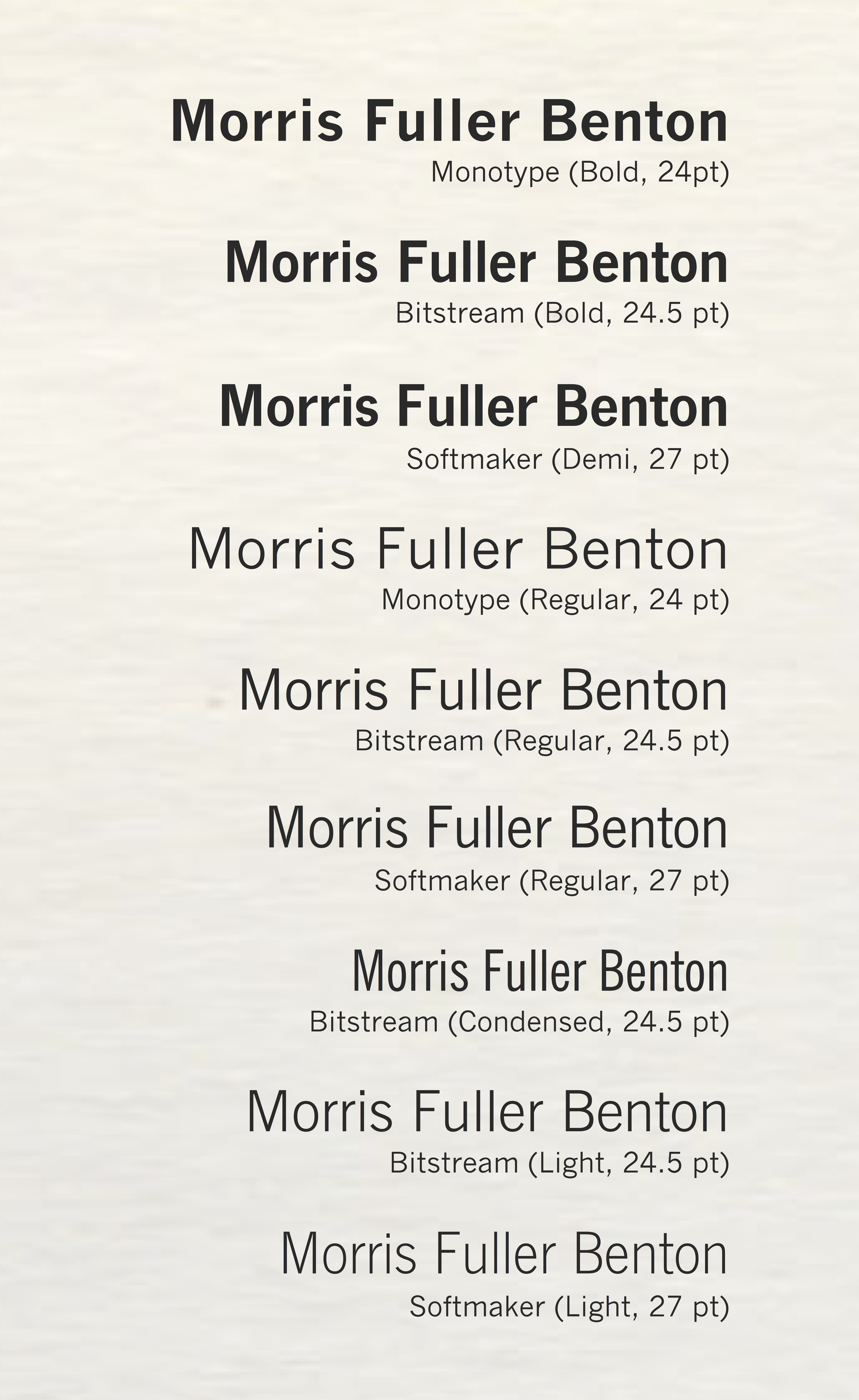
Several common News Gothic digitizations

Because there is no active descendant of the American Type Founders Corporation making digital typefaces, News Gothic has been revived in digital form in many different versions from different sources.

Benton Sans is a greatly expanded font family based on News Gothic by Font Bureau, adding additional features such as wide styles and extra bold weights. At 80 styles, it is one of the most comprehensive digital renditions of the News Gothic style. Its users include Newsweek, Fortune magazine, the Boston Globe and Sotheby's.

Digital releases actually named News Gothic have a variety of features, often adding weights not present in the original design or removing some less popular ones. For example, Bitstream's release is rare in including the extra-condensed styles. URW++'s (also sold by Fontsite) is only sold in one width but in a wide range of weights and with italics for every weight, while Linotype's lacks a light weight or any condensed styles. Monotype's revival, a subset of which is included with many Microsoft products, features the condensed style but not extra-condensed, and has wider spacing than several others. Adobe, Monotype, Linotype and Bitstream have their own versions. The Bitstream version of News Gothic was extended with Cyrillic glyphs in 2005 and Greek glyphs in 2009 by Dmitry Kirsanov for ParaType, and is sold by them separately.

Hamburg Serial is a lesser-known version of News Gothic by SoftMaker, with italics that have a one-story "a" and "g".

News Gothic No. 2 is an enhanced version of News Gothic, produced by the D. Stempel AG type foundry in 1984. It adds more weights to the News Gothic family than were available in other versions.

Adobe Source Sans Pro is a single-width design based on News Gothic, but differs in having true italics and a larger x-height for use with onscreen display. It was released in 2012 as Adobe's first open-source family under the SIL Open Font License. Adobe's training material highlights it as having a more consistent color on the page than the rather condensed News Gothic.

News Cycle is an open-source variant by Nathan Willis, based on 1908 specimens of News Gothic, extended with full Latin, Greek, and Cyrillic glyphs. It is an open source typeface licensed under the SIL Open Font License.

== Similar designs ==
Linotype called their similar design Trade Gothic, while the Ludlow version was known as Record Gothic. Intertype copied the face under the same name and added a variant, News Gothic Bold (1955). Baltimore Type's copy was called Balto Gothic, while their copy of Inland Type Foundry's Inland Gothic No. 6 was perversely sold under the name News Gothic.

In 1916, Sol Hess made alternate rounded characters for News Gothic Extra Condensed; the resulting face was sold by Lanston Monotype as Jefferson Gothic, which was also sold by Baltimore Type as Tourist Extra Condensed. In 1935, M.F. Benton did the same for ATF, and the face was called Phenix.

Ludlow's Record Gothic began as a mere knock-off, but between 1956 and 1961, their in-house designer R. Hunter Middleton made many original additions to the family including:

- Record Gothic Condensed Italic
- Record Gothic Extended + Italic
- Record Gothic Bold + Italic
- Record Gothic Bold Condensed
- Record Gothic Bold Extended + Italic
- Record Gothic Bold Extended Reverse
- Record Gothic Thinline condensed
- Record Gothic Heavy Condensed
- Record Gothic Light Medium-Extended
- Record Gothic Medium-Extended + Italic
- Record Gothic Bold Medium-Extended
- Record Gothic Heavy Medium-Extended

Record Gothic is, again, a very inconsistent family, and has never been fully digitized.

Yu Gothic is a Japanese font bundled with some versions of Microsoft Windows, but the Latin glyphs look similar to News Gothic. The fonts are otherwise unrelated.

== Notable usages ==
The well-known logo of ABBA using bold variant of this font

- The bold variant of News Gothic is used in the logo for the Swedish pop group ABBA, conceived in 1976 by Rune Söderqvist.
- News Gothic Bold was used in the Star Wars opening crawl for the main body of the text, as well as for the closing credits of each of the films in that series.
- The version of News Gothic that was on IBM typesetters was used widely by Fluxus artists such as George Maciunas (in his Fluxpublications) and George Brecht (in his event scores).
- The logo adopted by Polaroid Corporation in the late 1950s, designed by Paul Giambarba, is set in News Gothic, as was much of the type on the company's packaging and documentation until the 1980s.
- General Electric used a variant of the News Gothic typeface in transition from 2003 until they debuted the GE Inspira typeface in July 2004.
- The numbers on the vertical split-flap displays found in game shows between the late 1960s and the 1970s used News Gothic Bold.
- The letter tiles in the original American version of Scrabble are in News Gothic.
- The Halton Catholic District School Board uses News Gothic as the primary typeface in all of its communications and reports, as well as in its logo.
- Heidelberg Gothic, a variant of News Gothic, is the house font of the Heidelberg Gruppe.
- JCP News Gothic, commissioned by JCPenney, consists of two new weights coordinated with Monotype News Gothic, and was designed for use in advertising campaigns.
- The primary State Farm typeface is SF News Gothic, a branded version of News Gothic.
- By law, the legend of the Seal of Ohio is set in News Gothic.

== Bibliography ==
- Baines, Phil, Hastam, Andrew. Type and Typography. Watson-Guptill Publications: 2005. ISBN 0-8230-5528-0.
- Blackwell, Lewis. 20th Century Type. Yale University Press: 2004. ISBN 0-300-10073-6.
- Fiedl, Frederich, Nicholas Ott and Bernard Stein. Typography: An Encyclopedic Survey of Type Design and Techniques Through History, Black Dog & Leventhal: 1998. ISBN 1-57912-023-7.
- Jaspert, W. Pincus, W. Turner Berry and A. F. Johnson. The Encyclopædia of Type Faces, Blandford Press Lts.: 1953, 1983. ISBN 0-7137-1347-X.
- Macmillan, Neil. An A–Z of Type Designers. Yale University Press: 2006. ISBN 0-300-11151-7.
- Meggs, Phillip B. Revival of the Fittest, RC Publications, Inc: 2002. ISBN 1-883915-08-2.
