= Cheltenham (typeface) =

1896 display typeface

- The original variant 1903 year by ATF. The cold type redesign variant 1975 year by ITC.
- Category: Serif
- Classification: old style
- Designers: Bertram Grosvenor Goodhue; Ingalls Kimball; Morris Fuller Benton; Joseph W. Phinney
- Foundry: American Type Founders
- Date released: 1903

Cheltenham is a typeface for display use designed in 1896 by architect Bertram Goodhue and Ingalls Kimball, director of the Cheltenham Press. The original drawings were known as Boston Old Style and were made about 14" high. These drawings were then turned over to Morris Fuller Benton at American Type Founders (ATF) who developed it into a final design. Trial cuttings were made as early as 1899 but the face was not complete until 1902. The face was patented by Kimball in 1904. Later the basic face was spun out into an extensive type family by Morris Fuller Benton.

Cheltenham is not based on a single historical model, and shows influences of the Arts and Crafts Movement. Originally intended as a text face, "Chelt" became hugely successful as the "king of the display faces." Part of the face's huge popularity is because, as it has elements of both an old style and transitional face, a Cheltenham headline complements virtually any body type. The overwhelming popularity of the face for display purposes lasted until the advent of the geometric sans-serif typefaces of the 1930s.

== Foundry Type ==
The following versions were available in foundry type:

- ATF's Cheltenham series
  - Cheltenham (1903, Bertram Goodhue, Ingalls Kimball, Morris Fuller Benton and/or Joseph W. Phinney)
  - Cheltenham Bold (1903, Morris Fuller Benton)
  - Cheltenham Bold Condensed (1904, Morris Fuller Benton)
  - Cheltenham Bold Italic + Cheltenham Bold Condensed Italic + Cheltenham Wide + Cheltenham Bold Outline (1905, Morris Fuller Benton)
  - Cheltenham Bold Extra Condensed + Cheltenham Bold Extended (1906, Morris Fuller Benton)
  - Cheltenham Inline + Cheltenham Inline Extra Condensed'
  - Cheltenham Inline Extended (1907, Morris Fuller Benton)
  - Cheltenham Oldstyle Condensed + Cheltenham Medium (1909, Morris Fuller Benton)
  - Cheltenham Medium Italic + Cheltenham Extra Bold (1910, Morris Fuller Benton)
  - Cheltenham Bold Shaded + Cheltenham Bold Italic Shaded + Cheltenham Extra Bold Shaded (1912, Morris Fuller Benton)
  - Cheltenham Medium Condensed + Cheltenham Medium Expanded (1913, Morris Fuller Benton)
  - Venetian (1911, Morris Fuller Benton) was originally called Cheltenham #2, but its resemlance to the original face was only slight.
- Linotype, Monotype, and Ludlow all produced their own Cheltenham under that name and with almost as many variations as ATF. A few new variations were added:
  - Cheltenham Cursive (R. Hunter Middleton, Ludlow)
  - Cheltenham Wide Italic (Sol Hess, Monotype)
- Western Type Foundry called their version Chesterfield
- Hansen Type Foundry called their version Craftsman
- Inland Type Foundry called their version Kenilworth (1904)
- Keystone Type Foundry called their version Lowell (1905, Charles W. Smith)
- Stephenson Blake called their version Winchester
- English Monotype called their version Gloucester
- Fonderie Olive called their version Americaines Nouvelles
- Intertype called their version Cheltonian
- Berthold called their version Sorbonne (1905)

== Cold Type Versions ==
The popularity of Cheltenham continued strong right in the cold type era, and it was offered by various manufacturers under the following names:

- Nordoff — Autologic
- Gloucester — Monotype
- Cheltonian — Harris
- Sorbonne — Berthold

A cold type variant ITC Cheltenham, was also designed by Tony Stan for the International Typeface Corporation, in 1975. It features a larger x-height and improved italic details. The family includes 4 weights and 2 width each, with complementary italics.

== Digital versions ==
The original face has been digitized by the current owner, Kingsley/ATF and is sold by Bitstream Inc. The ITC version is also available from Linotype, Monotype, and Adobe Systems, along with ITC Cheltenham Handtooled, a 1993 version with highlight, designed by Ed Benguiat. Other versions are available from Tilde, Font Bureau, URW++, Scangraphic Digital Type Collection, and Elsner+Flake. Besley Clarendon is available from HiH. Monotype offers its version under the name Gloucester.

== Prominent usage ==
In 2003, The New York Times introduced a more unified Cheltenham typographic palette for its headline use in the print edition. Previously, Cheltenham was only one of several types including a sans-serif in a Victorian looking mix of headline faces. Tom Bodkin, assistant managing editor and design director of the Times, engaged typeface designer Matthew Carter to create multiple weights and a heavily condensed width of Cheltenham to replace most of the Latin Extra Condensed face in use, as well as Bookman and a variant of Century Bold.

In the U.S. Congress the bill or resolution number of all bills and resolutions set for public printing is set in Cheltenham. The typeface is also featured within the bills and laws themselves to designate title and section headings.

The Liturgical Press uses the Cheltenham Bold typeface for Lectionaries prescribed by the United States Conference of Catholic Bishops for Roman Catholic dioceses in the United States.

IDG's ...for Dummies series of how-to books are set in ITC Cheltenham.

L.L.Bean's logo is set in Cheltenham.

Akai's logo is set in ITC Cheltenham Ultra, with red letters over a white background, which creates a candle image effect on the negative space of letters A, K and A.

The street name plaques of Helsinki are set in Cheltenham.

This font is used prominently in the Japanese anime Cowboy Bebop, most notably for the ending cards of each episode, usually with the phrase "See you Space Cowboy..."

From 1992 to 2000, Mars Incorporated used this font for the flavor descriptions (Plain, Peanut, etc.) of the M&M's candies.

== Bibliography ==
- Blackwell, Lewis. 20th Century Type. Yale University Press: 2004. ISBN 0-300-10073-6.
- Fiedl, Frederich, Nicholas Ott and Bernard Stein. Typography: An Encyclopedic Survey of Type Design and Techniques Through History. Black Dog & Leventhal: 1998. ISBN 1-57912-023-7.
- Jaspert, W. Pincus, W. Turner Berry and A.F. Johnson. The Encyclopedia of Type Faces. Blandford Press Lts.: 1953, 1983. ISBN 0-7137-1347-X.
- Lawson, Alexander S., Anatomy of a Typeface. Godine: 1990. ISBN 978-0-87923-333-4.
- Macmillan, Neil. An A–Z of Type Designers. Yale University Press: 2006. ISBN 0-300-11151-7.
