= Century type family =

Typeface

Century
- Category: Serif
- Classification: Didone, Scotch Modern
- Designers: Linn Boyd and Morris Fuller Benton
- Foundry: American Type Founders
- Date released: 1894–1923
- Variations: Century Expanded, Century Schoolbook, Century Old Style, Century Catalogue, Century 731, Century 751, Century 725, Century Schoolbook Monospace
- Also known as: Century 701; Century 702; Monospace 722; Revival 707
- Shown here: Century Schoolbook

Century is a family of serif type faces particularly intended for body text. The family originates from a first design, Century Roman, cut by American Type Founders designer Linn Boyd Benton in 1894 for master printer Theodore Low De Vinne, for use in The Century Magazine. ATF rapidly expanded it into a very large family, first by Linn Boyd, and later by his son Morris. With ATF no longer operating, a wide variety of variants and revivals with varying features and quality are available.

Century is based on the "Scotch" genre, a style of type of British origin which had been popular in the United States from the early nineteenth century and is part of the "Didone" genre of type popular through the entire nineteenth century. Its design emphasizes crispness and elegance, with ball terminals, minimalist brackets, prominent slab serifs, and high contrast between thick and thin strokes. Generous whitespace between the letters is intended to offset the weight of the thick strokes. Readability is improved by line spacing because of taller x-height.

Despite originating in the nineteenth century, use of the typeface remains strong for periodicals, textbooks, and literature. The Supreme Court of the United States requires that briefs be typeset in Century family type. The Supreme Court also uses Century Schoolbook for its published opinions. According to Charles Shaw, "The rugged simplicity of the Century family of types has made it an enduring favorite of American typographers for almost one hundred years. Beginning as foundry type, Century has withstood a series of technical transformations into Linotype, Monotype, Ludlow, phototype, transfer type, digital type, and Xerox-like 'toner type'."

== Distinctive characteristics ==
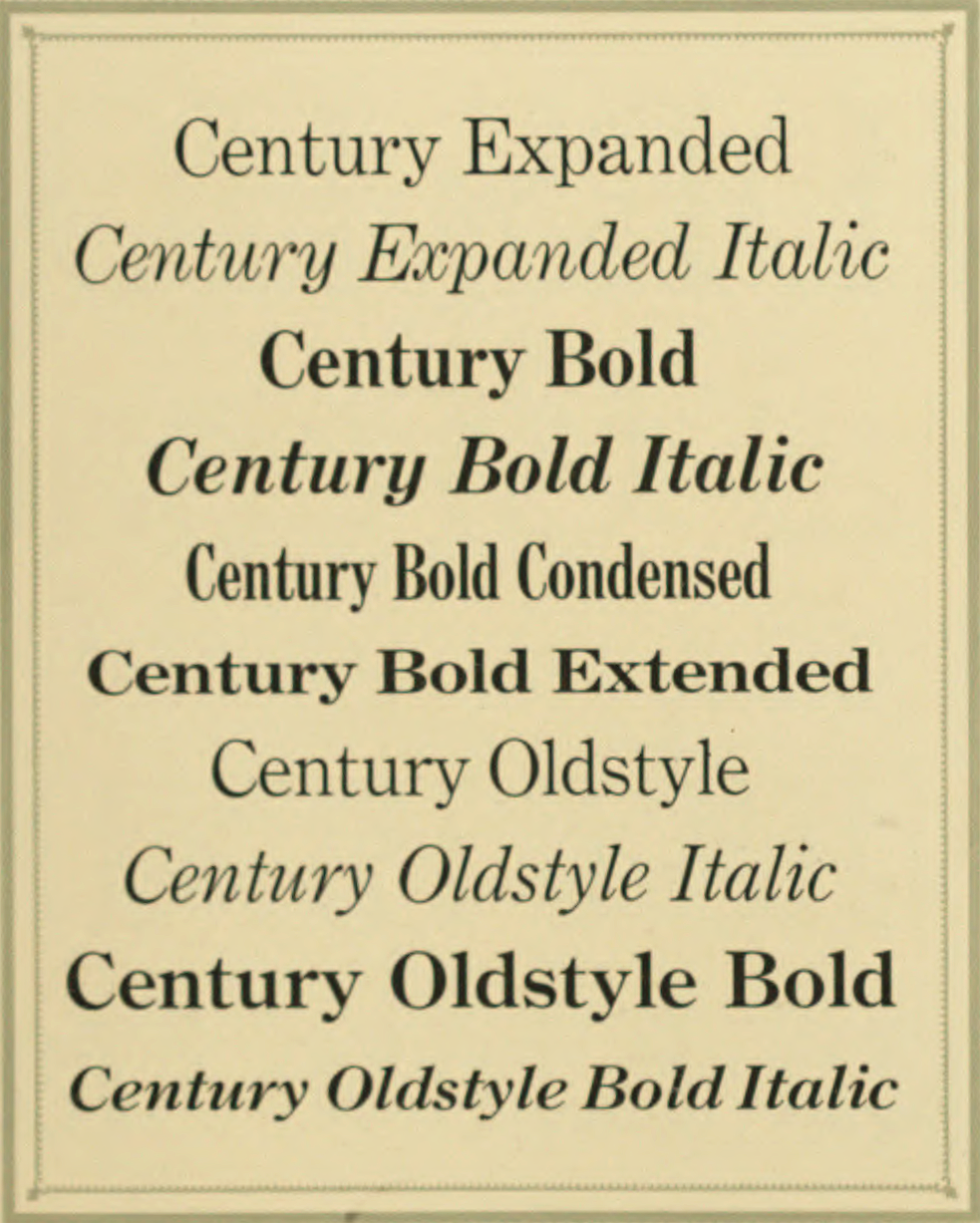
Century types from the ATF specimen book, 1912. Century Schoolbook had not yet been released at this time.

Characteristics of this typeface are:

lower case: curl ending in a ball terminal on top of letter c. Ball terminal on hook of f, ear of g, and tail of j.

upper case: curled tail on the capital R and reflexive curled tail on the capital Q. Prominent top spur on capital C.

figures: curl ending in a ball terminal on both tails of 3, and on single tail of 2, 5, 6 and 9.

== Variations ==
=== Century Roman ===
Century Roman
- Category: Serif
- Classification: Modern
- Designer: Linn Boyd Benton
- Commissioned by: Theodore Low De Vinne for the Century Magazine
- Foundry: American Type Founders
- Date created: 1894
- Date released: November, 1895 issue of Century Magazine

Theodore Low De Vinne, the printer of Century Magazine, wanted a more legible typeface for the magazine. He commissioned his friend Linn Boyd Benton from the newly formed American Type Founders to devise such a face. Over the course of the nineteenth century, largely because of the influence of Bodoni, common printing fonts had become thin, making a weak impression on the page. De Vinne and fellow printer William Morris decried this "growing effeminacy" and called for a reversion to sturdier faces. The face L.B. Benton produced, Century Roman, had a larger x-height than most faces and thicker hair-lines than was common, giving the appearance of a condensed face because De Vinne believed this to be more legible. This was made only in foundry type and later an accompanying face of normal width was produced by L.B. Benton, called variously Century Broad Face or Century No. 2. Despite being the original member of the Century family, it is not popular compared to the later members of the family with more normal proportions.

=== Century ===
Century
- Category: Serif
- Classification: Modern
- Designer: Morris Fuller Benton
- Commissioned by: American Type Founders
- Foundry: American Type Founders
- Date created: 1900
- Date released: 1900–1910
- Re-issuing foundries: Barnhart Brothers & Spindler, Linotype, Intertype, Monotype, Ludlow
- Design based on: Century Roman + Bruce #16 Roman
- Also known as: Century Expanded

With the merging of twenty-three foundries into American Type Founders in 1892, Linn Boyd Benton's son, Morris Fuller Benton, was given the task of consolidating and purging the faces of these manufacturers into a coherent selection. Following this, he was given the task of adapting Century No. 2 to meet the Typographical Union standards of the time. Records now in the Smithsonian show that M.F. Benton not only re-designed his father's face, but did so with reference to #16 Roman of the Bruce Type Foundry which A.T.F. had recently acquired. (And which, probably not coincidentally, had been introduced in the Bruce Foundry catalog of 1877 which had been printed by De Vinne.) The result was Century Expanded, which proved hugely successful. By 1912 the A.T.F. catalog no longer offered the original Century Roman, while displaying 64 pages of samples of other members of the Century family. Following the successful introduction of this type, M.F. Benton embarked upon the creation of the first planned type family, and it is this conception of "type families" that is probably Benton's single greatest achievement. The faces were issued over a period of ten years, all of which were designed by Benton and issued by A.T.F.:

- Century Expanded (1900)
- Century Italic + Century Bold (1905)
- Century Bold Condensed (1909)
- Century Bold Extended (1910)

==== Hot metal copies ====
Century proved to be hugely popular and was either licensed or copied by all the makers of mechanical composition machines, including Linotype, Intertype, and Monotype. Barnhart Brothers & Spindler called their version Century Roman, while Ludlow called their 1953 version Century Modern. A few variants were even added:

- Century Bold Condensed Italic (1938, Sol Hess, Monotype)
- Century Extra Bold Extended (Linotype), designed for use in newspaper and magazine headlines.

==== Cold type copies ====
Century's popularity and usefulness continued right through the cold type era and was made available for photocomposition by all the leading producers under the following names:

- Century Expanded – Autologic, Berthold, Dymo, Harris, Mergenthaler, Monotype, Varityper, Linotype, Bitstream
- Century X – Alphatype
- Century Light – Compugraphic
- Censtar Expanded – Star/Photon
- Cambridge Expanded – Graphic Systems Inc.
- Digi-Antiqua – Hell AG
- ITC Century - ITC: a less faithful version with increased x-height, but extremely popular, has also been digitised.

A Century typeface was also available for the IBM Selectric Composer.

==== Digital variants ====
A digital version named Benton Modern Text was first prepared by Font Bureau for the Boston Globe and the Detroit Free Press. It was designed by Tobias Frere-Jones and is based on Century Expanded, but the accompanying italic and bold are based upon Century Schoolbook and were designed by Richard Lipton and Christian Schwartz. Benton Modern was released in two optical sizes: text for general use and display for large text sizes. Font Bureau had already digitised as a separate project Century Bold Condensed on its own, intending it particularly for newspaper headlines.

=== Century Oldstyle ===
Century Oldstyle
- Category: Serif
- Classification: Old Style
- Designer: Morris Fuller Benton
- Commissioned by: American Type Founders
- Foundry: American Type Founders
- Date created: 1909
- Date released: 1909–1915
- Re-issuing foundries: Linotype, Intertype, Monotype, Bitstream
- Design based on: Century Roman + Caslon
- Also known as: Old Style No. 9 (Linotype)

Century Oldstyle was released at a time when heavier faces with bracketed serifs were returning to vogue. The faces, all designed by Benton, were issued by A.T.F. over a period of six years. Century Oldstyle is Linn Boyd Benton's and Morris Fuller Benton's renovation of Phemister's Miller & Richard Old Style for ATF (also known as Bookman Oldstyle) forty-five years later, using the Century name for marketing purposes. Despite the name it is not purely an old-style serif font (the type of metal type used before around 1750), but retains many more modern characteristics such as its curling capital Q.

- Century Oldstyle + italic + bold (1909)
- Century Oldstyle Bold Italic (1910)
- Century Oldstyle Bold Condensed (1915)

==== Hot metal copies ====
Century Oldstyle was not as popular as its predecessor, but the roman and italic were copied by Linotype, Intertype, and Monotype.

==== Cold type copies ====
As oldstyle faces gained in popularity during the photo-comp era, Century Oldstyle was copied more widely then than during the hot type era. Copies were made under following names:

- Century Oldstyle – Alphatype, Berthold, Harris, Mergenthaler
- Cambridge Oldstyle – Graphic Systems Inc.

=== Century Catalogue ===
Century Catalogue
- Category: Serif
- Classification: Modified Old Style
- Designer: Morris Fuller Benton
- Commissioned by: American Type Founders
- Foundry: American Type Founders
- Date created: 1917
- Date released: 1917
- Design based on: Century Expanded

Century Catalogue (as spelled in ATF specimen books) had a lower x-height than Century Expanded but, despite longer ascenders, adheres to the same general design. Century Catalogue Italic is basically a re-working of Baskerville Italic, only the A, V and W being different. Both were designed by M.F. Benton and released by A.T.F. in 1917. As far as is known, Century Catalogue was never copied by other foundries, for machine composition, or as cold type. Raph Levien has produced a "nearly complete" (but largely unworked on for the past decade) digitization of Century Catalogue under the terms of the Open Font License.

=== Century Schoolbook Monospace ===
Century Schoolbook Monospace
- Category: Monospace
- Classification: Transitional
- Designer: Morris Fuller Benton
- Date created: 1918
- Date released: 1918–1923
- Re-issuing foundries: Bitstream

=== Century Schoolbook ===
Century Schoolbook
- Category: Serif
- Classification: Transitional
- Designer: Morris Fuller Benton
- Commissioned by: Ginn & Company
- Foundry: American Type Founders
- Date created: 1918
- Date released: 1918–1923
- Re-issuing foundries: Linotype, Intertype, Monotype, Ludlow, Bitstream
- Design based on: Century Expanded
- Also known as: Century Modern (Ludlow)

Century Schoolbook is a transitional serif typeface designed by Morris Fuller Benton in 1919 for the American Type Founders (ATF) at the request of Ginn & Co., a textbook publisher, which wanted an especially easy-to-read face for textbooks. Century Schoolbook has elements similar to the Didone classification. Century Schoolbook is based on the earlier Century Roman.

Century Schoolbook is familiar to many in North America as being the typeface with which many first learned to read. Morris Fuller Benton utilized research done by Clark University that showed young readers more quickly identified letterforms with contrasting weight, but with the lighter strokes maintaining presence. Tests also showed the importance of maintaining counter-form (the white space around the black letterform) in recognizing the face at smaller sizes. In designing Century Schoolbook, M. F. Benton increased the x-height, the stroke width, and overall letterspacing. The faces were issued over a period of five years, all of which were designed by Benton and issued by A.T.F.:

- Century Schoolbook (1918)
- Century Schoolbook Italic (1921)
- Century Schoolbook Bold (1923)

A final member of the Century family was an oldstyle version called Schoolbook Oldstyle begun in 1920 and released in 1926, an italic following in 1928. This never achieved the popularity of its sister faces, was never adapted for machine composition (much less cold type or digital) and was eventually withdrawn.

==== Hot metal copies ====
Another immensely popular face for A.T.F. and Benton, Century Schoolbook was either licensed or copied by all the makers of mechanical composition machines, including Linotype, Intertype, Monotype, and Ludlow. One variant, Century Schoolbook Bold Italic was even added by Intertype. Linotype also commissioned Rudolph Ruzicka to design Primer, Bitstream which was intended to compete directly with Century Schoolbook for the text-book market.

==== Cold type copies ====
The popularity of Century Schoolbook outstripped that of Century in the cold type era, and it was offered by all manufacturers under the following names:

- Century Schoolbook – Autologic, Berthold, Dymo, Harris, Mergenthaler, Monotype, MGD Graphic Systems.
- Century Text – Alphatype
- Century Textbook – Compugraphic
- Censtar School – Star/Photon
- Cambridge Schoolbook – Graphic Systems Inc.
- Schoolbook – Varityper

==== Digital copies ====
The most common digital version is Monotype's, bundled with many Microsoft products. There are also versions of New Century Schoolbook by URW++, DTP Types, Bitstream, Elsner+Flake and others.

A very limited set of styles digitised by URW++ has been released as open-source software as part of the Ghostscript project in type 1 format. TeX Gyre Schola is an adaptation of the URW release by a Polish group. Including a Cyrillic version and small caps, it is perhaps the most complete open-source digitisation of the Century family.

Confusingly, the Monotype version offered with Microsoft products is also called just 'Century', perhaps for backwards compatibility reasons from the period when file names had to be short. Modern Microsoft products include both this 'Century' (in roman style only but with Cyrillic characters) and the same design as 'Century Schoolbook', only the latter including the whole family with bold and italics.

==== Digital variants ====
Grad is a variant by Phil Martin (digitized by Mark Simonson) based on the original ATF Century Schoolbook. It is an extensive digitisation with text figures and small caps, also adding unusual features such as asymmetric serifs.

Century Supra was designed by Matthew Butterick to be narrower and darker and includes a separate set of caps fonts. Presumably, it was designed with the intent to be used in legal pleadings, as Matthew is an attorney practicing in California; he was a typographic designer before law school.

==== Century Schoolbook Infant ====

This is a single-story version of the typeface that is used to help children learn to read. It is very rare, but it can be found in the Spot books by Eric Hill.

==== Cyrillic adaptations ====
The Century Schoolbook typeface was also adapted by Soviet typographies. The first Cyrillic adaptation, named Pioner (Russian for "pioneer"), was designed in 1939, and later in 1961 the second adaptation was made in the scientific research institute (NII) "Poligrafmash". The latter version acquired the name Shkol'naya (Russian for "of school") and since then it has been the standard and most widely used typeface for children publications and for school textbooks in the Soviet Union and later in Russia.

=== Century Nova ===
Century Nova + Italic (1964) was designed by Charles E. Hughes with the stipulation from A.T.F. that it must be equally suited for both letterpress (hot type) and offset (cold type) reproduction. The thin lines are substantial and the lower-case letters have a larger x-height, and (perhaps ironically) it returns to the condensed nature of the original Century Roman. This was the second-to-last face cut by A.T.F. Scangraphic has released a digitisation.

== Related digital revivals ==
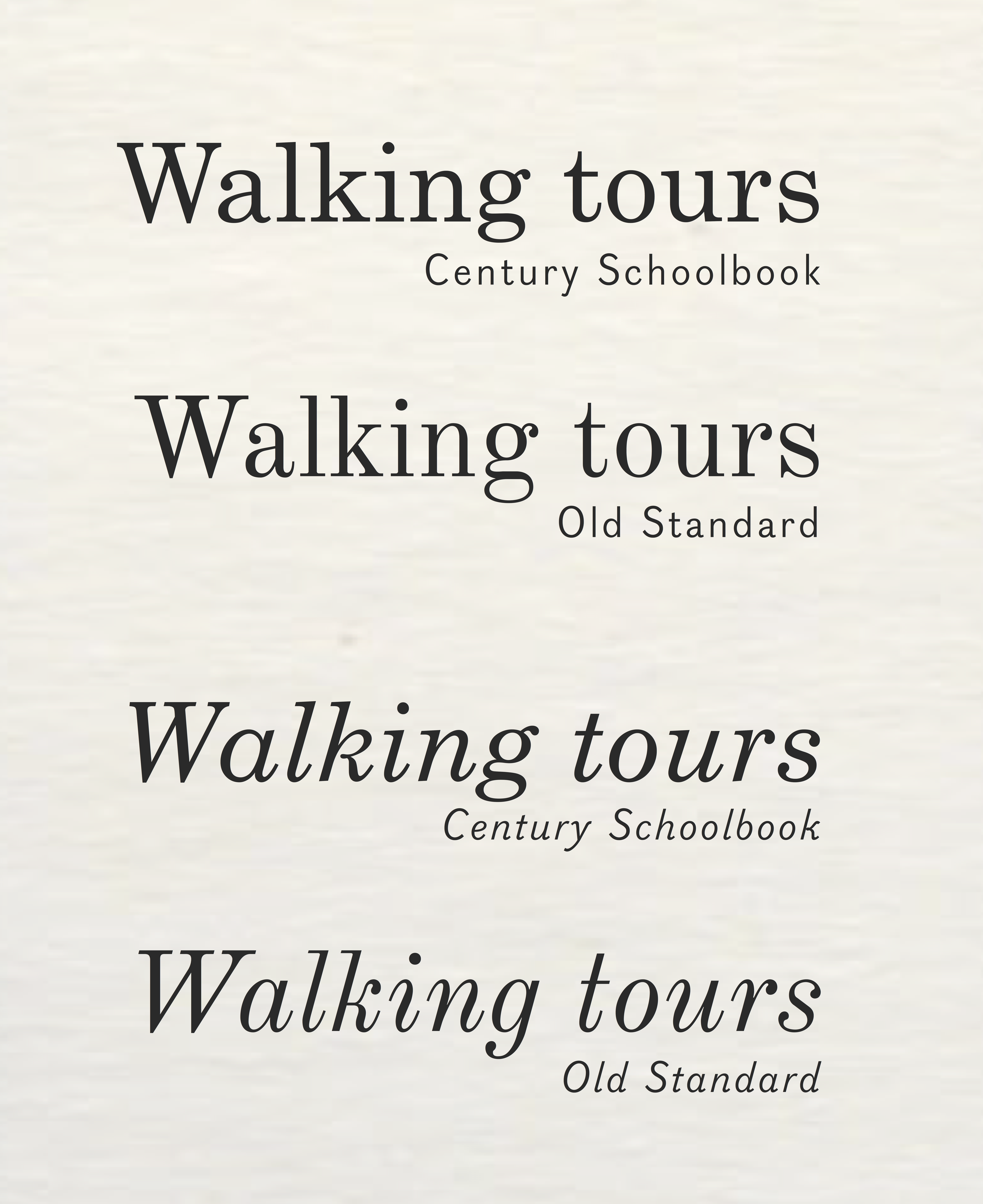
Comparison between Century Schoolbook (in Monotype's digitisation) and Old Standard by Alexey Kryukov, based on nineteenth-century printing especially from Russia. Both have the same basic letter structure but Old Standard is much more crisp with finer hairlines and serifs, especially in italic.

Nick Shinn's Scotch Modern revival is a digitisation in three optical sizes of the Scotch Modern types that inspired Century. Described by reviewer Mark Simonson as 'insanely complete', it has a stronger level of contrast and sharper Didone serifs than Century designs, in a release featuring small caps and a range of matching figure designs. Shinn based the revival on that used in an 1873 book on New York State wildlife.

The Old Standard web font by Alexey Kryukov is loosely based on the similar styles of type that were used in Europe during the early 20th century. It includes Cyrillic and polytonic Greek glyphs for classical studies use.

Matthew Carter's Miller is a revival of the Scotch Roman types that are Century's distant ancestors in the early nineteenth century. It features a much more restrained level of stroke contrast. It is an extremely large family often used by newspapers, with five optical sizes and many professional features such as small caps and alternate figure designs. Chronicle Text and Display by Hoefler & Frere-Jones are another large Scotch Roman-inspired family with optical sizes intended for newspaper and professional use.

Eames Century Modern is a digitisation inspired by the family's use by furniture designers Charles and Ray Eames. It is used by Comedy Central, among others.

== See also ==
- Typefaces category
- List of typefaces
