= Anatomy of a Typeface =

1990 nonfiction book

- Cover of Anatomy of a Typeface
- Author: Alexander Lawson
- Subject: Typography
- Publisher: David R. Godine, Publisher
- Publication date: 1990
- Publication place: United States
- Media type: Print
- Pages: 428
- ISBN: 978-0-87923-333-4
- OCLC: 14068305
- Dewey Decimal: 686.2/24 19
- LC Class: Z250 .L34 1990

Anatomy of a Typeface is a 1990 book on typefaces written by Alexander Lawson.

== Background ==
The book is notable for devoting entire chapters to the development and uses of individual or small groupings of typefaces. The book is also set in Galliard, which happens to have its own chapter in the book. The first thirty chapters specifically are devoted to an individual typeface per chapter.

Within Anatomy, Lawson arranges the typefaces by classification. In his preface, Lawson qualifies his classification: "After using this system in the teaching of typography over a thirty-year period, I know that it is reasonably effective in the initial study of printing types. I am not disposed to consider it faultless by any means. A classification system, after all, is simply a tool ... Its primary purpose is to help people become familiar with these forms preparatory to putting them to effective and constructive typographic use."

== 31 Chapters of Anatomy of a Typeface ==
- the Black-letter Types:
  - Goudy Text and Hammer Uncial
- Old Style Types:
  - Cloister Old Style
  - Centaur
  - Bembo
  - Arrighi
  - Dante
  - Goudy Old Style
  - Palatino
  - Garamond
  - Galliard
  - Granjon
  - Sabon
  - Janson
  - Caslon
  - Baskerville
  - Bodoni
  - Bulmer
  - Bell
  - Oxford
  - Caledonia
  - Cheltenham
  - Bookman
- Newspaper Types:
  - Times Roman
- Twentieth-century Gothics:
  - Franklin Gothic;
- Square-serif Revival:
  - Clarendon;
- Humanist Sans-serif Types:
  - Optima;
- Geometric Sans-serif Types:
  - Futura;
- Script, Cursive, and Decorated Types; Type Making from Punch to Computer.

== Editions ==
The book has been published a total of three times with the first release coming in 1990, the second edition released in 2002, and the third being released in 2010 and Published by David R, Godine.

== See also ==
- The Elements of Typographic Style
