= Broadway (typeface) =

Typeface

- Category: Sans Serif
- Classification: Display
- Designers: Morris Fuller Benton, Sol Hess
- Commissioned by: American Type Founders
- Foundry: American Type Founders
- Date created: 1927
- Date released: 1928
- Re-issuing foundries: Linotype, Elsner+Flake, Monotype, Bitstream, URW++
- Variations: Broadway, Broadway Engraved, Broadway Condensed

Broadway is a decorative typeface that heavily references the roaring 20's, Influenced by the aesthetics of Hollywood. This typeface embodies Art Deco, utilizing bold geometric lettering and high contrast between thick and thin line. The combination of both fat face and sans serif characteristics gives Broadway a functional yet attractive look.

The original typeface was designed by Morris Fuller Benton in 1927 for American Type Founders (ATF) as a capitals-only display face. It had a long initial run of popularity, before being discontinued by ATF in 1954. It was re-discovered in the cold type era and has since been used to evoke the feeling of the 1920s and 1930s. The font has been used in the TV shows Rhoda, My Life as a Teenage Robot, and Miami Vice. Several variants were made.

== History ==
Broadway has gained several styles since its first debut. The original Typeface (img 1) was created by Benton in 1927, and would be published the following year under ATF.

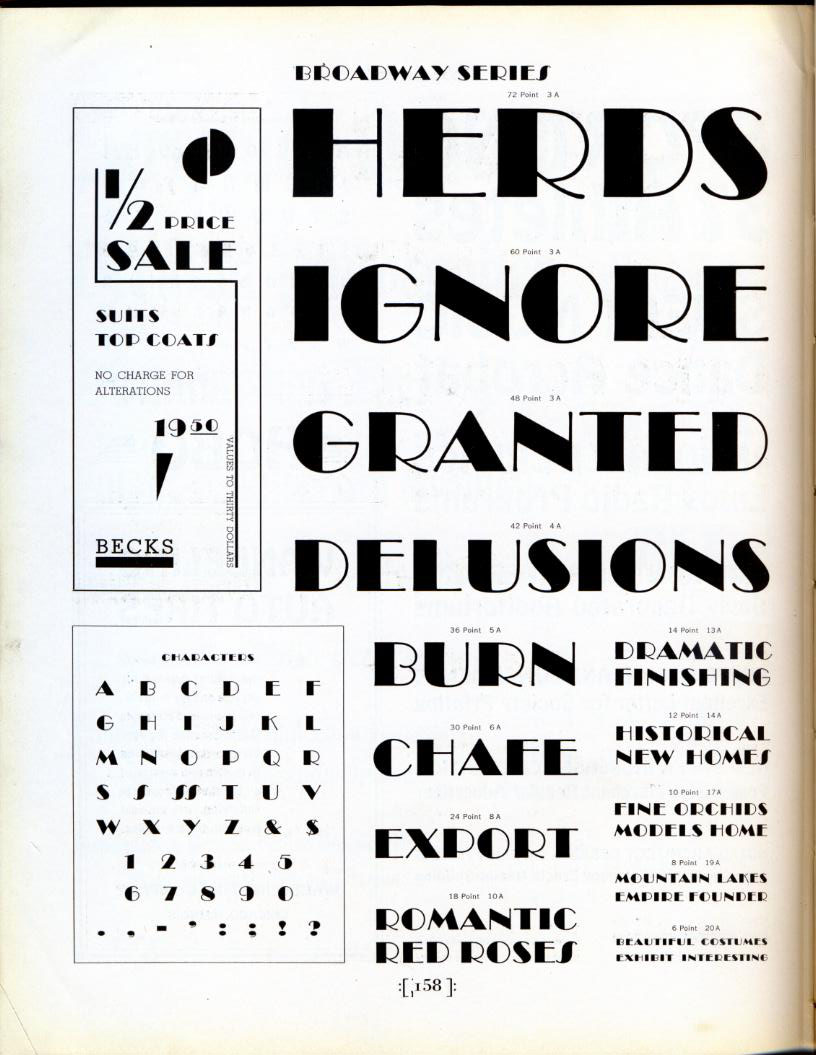

img 2. Broadway Engraved, 1928

img 3. Broadway with lowercase, 1929

Shortly after the original release, Sol Hess from the Lanston Monotype Company began working on Broadway Engraved, a monotype that would release in 1928 (img 2). Hess continued to add to the Broadway font, creating lowercase options in 1929 (img 3). That same year, Benton returned to Broadway once more to create Broadway Condensed.

== Digital versions ==
Digital versions are now made by Linotype, Elsner+Flake, Monotype, Bitstream, and URW++. Similar fonts, such as ITC Manhattan and Glitzy are sold by ITC and Ingrimayne Type respectively.
