= Hess Old Style =

Printing font

- Category: Serif
- Classification: Old Style
- Designer(s): Sol Hess
- Foundry: Lanston Monotype
- Date created: 1912
- Date released: 1920
- Design based on: Types of Nicolas Janson

Hess Old Style is an old style serif font, designed by Sol Hess for Lanston Monotype based on designs of Nicolas Jenson from 1479. It was released in 1920 with a companion italic made available in 1923. It was intended by Monotype to compete with ATF's popular Cloister Old Style, but it is both neater and heavier, making it more suitable for hard-finish papers. Like most Jenson-inspired designs, it has a tilted cross-stroke on the 'e'.

== Copies ==
As far as is known, this face was not copied by other foundries, nor was it emulated by any producer of cold type. A digital copy, including bold and extra-bold weights by Steve Jackaman, is part of the International TypeFounders "Red Rooster Collection".
