= Goudy Old Style =

- Category: Serif
- Classification: Old-style
- Designer: Frederic W. Goudy
- Foundry: American Type Founders
- Date released: 1915
- Re-issuing foundries: Lanston Monotype; Intertype; Ludlow

Goudy Old Style (formerly Goudy Oldstyle, also known as just Goudy) is an old-style serif typeface originally created by Frederic W. Goudy for American Type Founders (ATF) in 1915.

Suitable for text and display applications, Goudy Old Style matches the historicist trend of American printing in the early twentieth century, taking inspiration from the printing of the Italian Renaissance without a specific historical model. Eccentricities include the upward-curved ear on the g and the diamond shape of the dots of the i, j, and the points found in the period, colon and exclamation point, and the sharply canted hyphen. The design is relatively light in colour.

== History ==
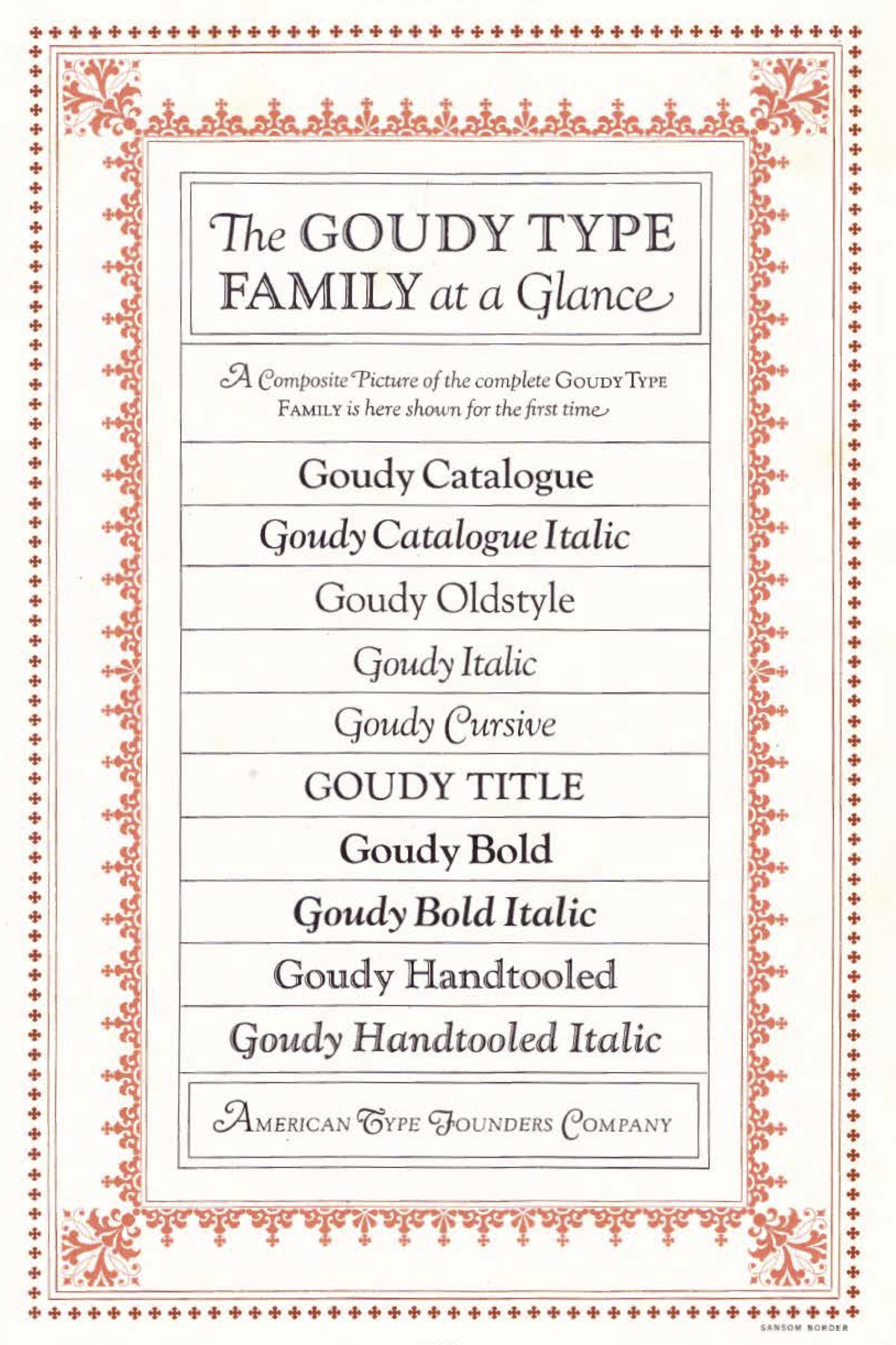
The set of fonts in the Goudy 'family' in ATF's 1923 specimen book: the Goudy Old Style, Goudy Catalogue and Goudy Handtooled subfamilies. Goudy Cursive is effectively Goudy Old Style with swashes.

In Goudy's autobiography, he described the italic based on study of sixteenth-century italics: "I studied many of the older italics and came to the conclusion that...some of the outstanding italics of the sixteenth century had little or no inclination and yet preserved their italic character".

Several variants, designed by several designers, were released in the ensuing years (all faces ATF unless otherwise specified). By Goudy:

- **Goudy Old Style** (1915)
- **Goudy Old Style Italic,** inspired by Aldine designs.
- **Goudy Cursive**, a "loose italic" adding swashes and more calligraphic alternate characters. Missing from most digitisations but included on the LTC release.

By Morris Fuller Benton:

- **Goudy Bold** (1916)
- **Goudy Title** (1918), a full size variation on Goudy's small capitals from the Goudy Old Style roman.
- **Goudy Bold Italic** (1919) The Lanston Monotype version of the italic includes cursive capitals by Sol Hess.
- **Goudy Catalog** (1919) and Goudy Catalog Italic (1921), designed as medium weight companions.
- **Goudy Extra Bold + Italic** (1927)

By others:

- **Goudy Handtooled + Italic** (1922), were in-line versions of Goudy Bold + Italic (with a white line inside the letter) and were probably designed by Charles H. Becker, though other authorities credit either Morris Fuller Benton or Wadsworth A. Parker. Again, the Lanston Monotype version of the italic includes cursive capitals by Sol Hess.
- **Goudy Children**, which features single-story variants of the letters a and g in italic, bold, and bold italic styles for use in children's books.

The face was an instant best seller, prompting ATF to issue a special 124-page specimen book of the series in 1927. The descenders of Goudy Old Style were kept short at ATF's insistence to allow tight line setting on their common line system, to Goudy's irritation. In addition, he sold the design to ATF for $1500 and received no royalty, causing his relationship with the foundry to deteriorate.

=== Hot metal copies ===
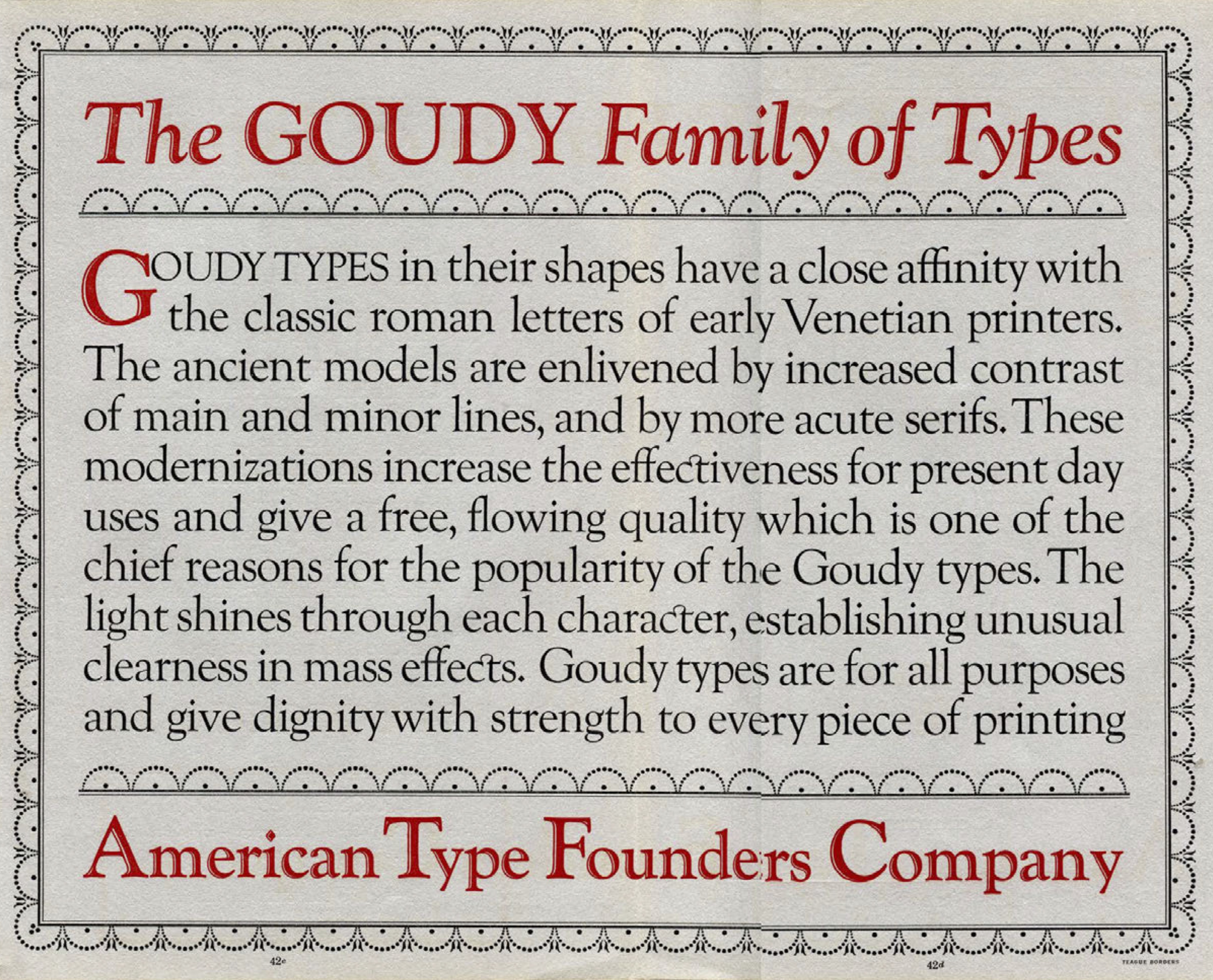

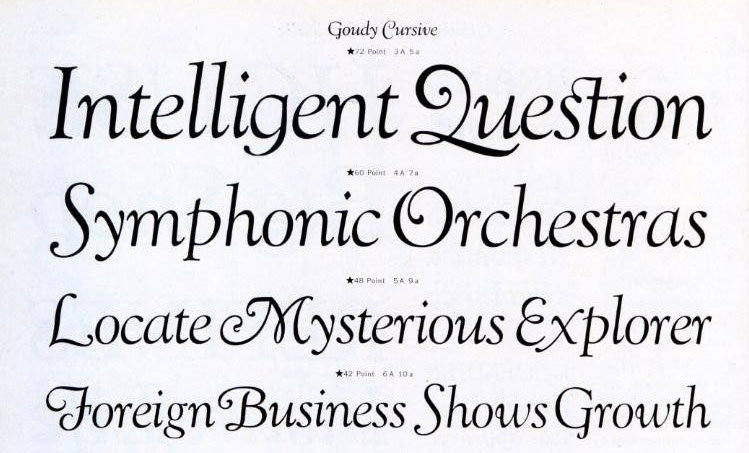
"Goudy Cursive", ATF's expansion of the design with additional swash characters.

The face was immediately licensed to Lanston Monotype and some of the weights were issued by Intertype as well. Ludlow called its 1924 knock-off the Number Eleven series. Monotype's designer F.H. Pierpont, better known for Rockwell and Monotype Grotesque, designed a similar face named Horley Old Style, adding a distinct influence of Caslon designs.

=== Cold type copies ===
As the face was a "classic" almost from the day of its issue, producers of cold type offered their own versions of Goudy Old Style under the following names:

- Goudy Oldstyle — Alphatype, Berthold, Harris, Mergenthaler
- Goudy Bold — Autologic
- Goudy Light — Dymo, Star/Photon
- Grecian Old Style — Graphic Systems Inc.

=== Digital copies ===
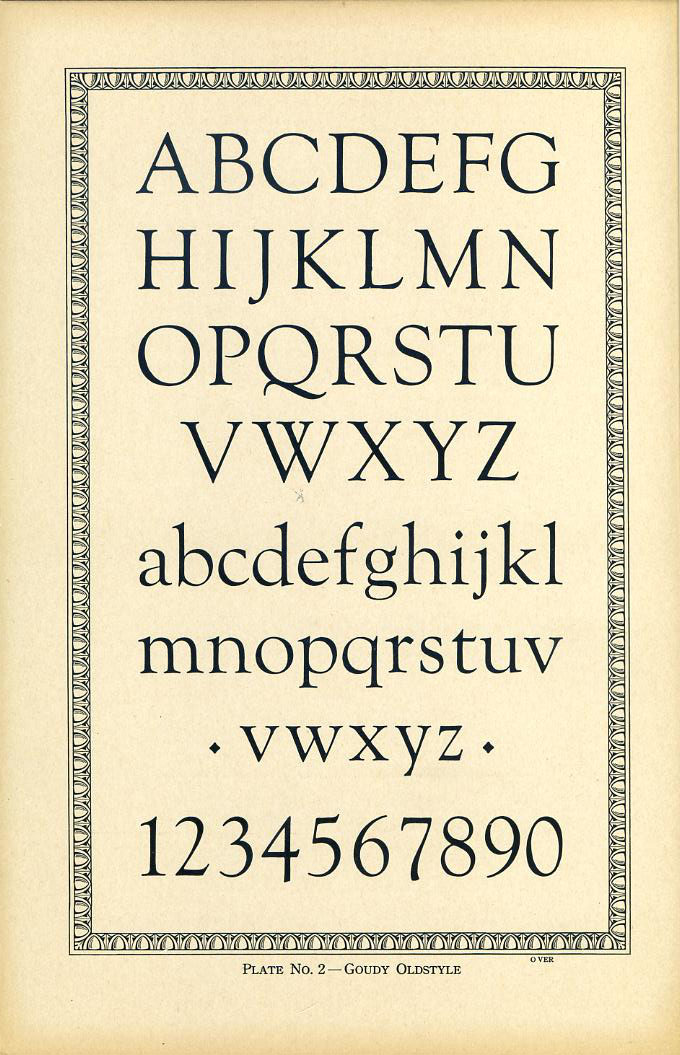
A sample of Goudy Old Style in original metal type.

Commercial releases have been made by Monotype, Fontsite, DTP Types, Electric Typographer, Lanston Type, Bitstream, URW++ (bundled with Microsoft Office), Adobe, and Linotype. As many early digitisations were sublicensed, several of these may represent the same digitisation marketed by different rights-holders, possibly upgraded with modern features such as contextual ligature substitution and small caps. LTC's digitisation includes the calligraphic and swash alternate characters, as well as small caps. Goudy Catalog has been copied by Scangraphic, Bitstream, URW++, and Elsner+Flake. A version called Goudy Schoolbook also exists, with single-story versions of the letters a and g, but it is not for sale to the general public. (The digitisation bundled with Microsoft Office lacks all these features; it does include ligatures, but they must be inserted manually.)

'Sorts Mill Goudy' is an open-source revival created by Barry Schwartz as part of the League of Movable Type project, which contains small capitals and other OpenType features. Bhikkhu Pesala expanded this under the name 'Sukhumala', adding bold, bold italic and handtooled styles.

ATF's other related fonts, Goudy Handtooled and Goudy Catalog, have also been digitised, again with a variety of companies holding some rights although only LTC's release includes Handtooled Italic. Goudy Title has not been digitised under that name.

=== Usage ===
Goudy Old Style is the text typeface used in Harper's Magazine. It is also the typeface used for headings in The Spectator. It is the official typeface of Emory University in Atlanta, Georgia, Lewis & Clark College in Portland, Oregon, Moravian College in Bethlehem, Pennsylvania, Northwestern University in Evanston, Illinois, Clemson University in Clemson, South Carolina, and Hamilton College in Clinton, New York. It is also used by the National University of Colombia. It is also the standard body text font for Key Club publications. The bold italic weight is used for the wordmark of Whittard's.

== See also ==
- List of typefaces designed by Frederic Goudy
