= Dubai (typeface) =

Multilingual sans-serif typeface

- Classification: Humanist
- Designer: Nadine Chahine (chief designer)
- Commissioned by: Government of Dubai
- Foundry: Monotype Imaging
- Date released: 2017
- License: Proprietary
- Variations: Dubai Light; Dubai Regular; Dubai Medium; Dubai Bold

Dubai is a sans-serif typeface commissioned by the Government of Dubai in partnership with Microsoft and designed by a six-member team led by Nadine Chahine from U.S.-based firm Monotype. It contains both Latin and Arabic script. The font, released on 30 April 2017, is included as part of Microsoft's Windows 10 and Office 365, and is also available for free download. It will be used by all government departments in Dubai, according to the instruction of the Dubai Executive Council. It is the first Microsoft font named after a city.

== Languages ==
It supports 23 languages: Afrikaans, Arabic, Basque, Britannic, Catalan, Danish, Dutch, English, Finnish, French, Gaelic, German, Icelandic, Indonesian, Italian, Norwegian, Persian, Portuguese, Sami, Spanish, Swahili, Swedish and Urdu.
