= Ingalls Kimball =

American printer (1874–1933)

- Born: Hannibal Ingalls Kimball; West Newton, Massachusetts
- Died: October 16, 1933 (aged 59)
- Occupation: Entrepreneur

Ingalls Kimball (born Hannibal Ingalls Kimball; April 2, 1874 – October 16, 1933) was an American printer and entrepreneur.

== Early years ==
Kimball was born in West Newton, Massachusetts to American entrepreneur Hannibal Ingalls Kimball and Mary (Cook) Kimball. He attended Harvard College from 1890 to 1894.

== Career ==
After graduation, he started the publishing and printing business Stone & Kimball with Herbert S. Stone.

The typeface Cheltenham

In 1897, Kimball established the Cheltenham Press in New York City. A year later, Kimball commissioned American architect and type designer Bertram Grosvenor Goodhue to design the namesake Cheltenham typeface, considered at one point to be the most widely known typeface in the United States.

In 1916, Kimball established the “National Thrift Bond Corporation”.
