= Sol Hess =

American typographer (1886–1953)

Sol Hess (born 1886, Philadelphia, PA – d. 1953) was an American typeface designer. After a three-year scholarship course at Pennsylvania Museum School of Industrial Design, he began at Lanston Monotype in 1902, rising to typographic manager in 1922. He was a close friend and collaborator with Monotype art director Frederic Goudy, succeeding him in that position in 1940. Hess was particularly adept at expanding type faces into whole families, allowing him to complete 85 faces for Monotype, making him America's fourth most prolific type designer. While he was with Monotype, Hess worked on commissions for many prominent users of type, including, Crowell-Collier, Sears Roebuck, Montgomery Ward, Yale University Press, World Publishing Company, and Curtis Publishing for whom he re-designed the typography of their Saturday Evening Post.

== Typefaces designed by Sol Hess ==
All faces cut by Lanston Monotype.

- Hess Title + Italic (1910)
  - Hess Title Italic (1911)
- Bookman series based on an oldstyle antique face designed by A.C. Phemister for the Scottish foundry of Miller & Richard about 1860.
  - Bookman Oldstyle Condensed (1916)
  - New Bookman (1927)
- Jefferson Gothic (1916), alternate characters for Benton's News Gothic Extra Condensed. Also cast by Baltimore Type & Composition Company as Tourist Extra Condensed.
- Cochin series, based on the original by the G. Peignot et Fils foundry in Paris.
  - Cochin (1917)
  - Cochin Italic (1921)
  - Cochin Bold + Bold Italic (1921)
  - Cochin Open (1927)
  - Cochin Bold Tooled, was designed in house by Monotype, probably by Hess.
- Goudy Old Style series, all based on Frederic Goudy's Old Style
  - Swash capitals for Goudy Bold Italic (1919)
  - Swash capitals for Goudy Handtooled Italic (1922)
  - Goudy Heavy Face Open' (1926)
  - Goudy Heavy Face Condensed (1927)
  - Goudy Text Shaded, was designed in house by Monotype, probably by Hess.
- Hess Old Style (1920), based on faces by Nicolas Jenson.
  - Hess Old Style Italic (1922)
- Hess Bold (1922), a companion face for Goudy's Goudy Light.
  - Hess Bold Italic (1924)
- Italian Old Style Wide (1924), designed as a companion to Goudy's Italian Old Style.
- Scotch Roman series based on faces cut by the Scottish foundry of Alexander Wilson & Son before 1833.
  - Scotch Open Shaded Italic (1924)
  - Swash initials for Scotch Roman Italic
- Kennerley Open Capitals (1925), designed as a companion to Goudy's Kennerley Open.
- Heavyface Condensed (1927)
- Alternate Gothic Modernized (1927), thirteen alternate characters for Benton's Alternate Gothic No. 1.
- Cooper Tooled (1928), based upon Oz Cooper's Cooper Hilite, though with the white line on the opposite side.
- Broadway series
  - Broadway Engraved (1928)
  - Lowercase letters for Benton's Broadway (1929)
- Tourist Gothic series
  - Tourist Gothic (1922), adapted from on Barnhart Brothers & Spindler's Modern Condensed Gothic by including a set of alternate rounded capitals.
  - Tourist Gothic Italic (1938)
  - Tourist Extra Condensed was actually just Baltimore Type's re-branding of Hess's Jefferson Gothic.
- Bodoni series
  - Bodoni Bold Panelled (1928)
  - Bodoni Bold Condensed (1934)
- Sans Serif series, based on Rudolf Koch’s Kabel.
  - Sans Serif Extrabold (1930)
  - Sans Serif Extrabold Condensed (1930)
  - Sans Serif Medium Condensed (1930)
  - Sans Serif Light Condensed (1930)
  - Sans Serif Lined
- Hadriano Stone Cut (1932), an in-line version of Goudy's Hadriano Title.
- Pendrawn (1933)
- Hess Neobold (1934)
- Stymie series, based on Benton's Stymie
  - Stymie Extrabold (1934)
  - Stymie Medium Condensed (1935)
  - Stymie Extrabold Condensed (1935)
  - Stymie Light Condensed (1936)
  - Stymie Extrabold Italic (1935)
- Baskerville Bold (1935), adapted from John Baskerville’s heavyface of 1757.
- Spire (1937), capital letters only.
- Twentieth Century series (1937)
  - Twentieth Century Bold Italic (1937)
  - Twentieth Century Extrabold Italic (1937)
  - Twentieth Century Extrabold Condensed Italic (1938)
  - Twentieth Century Ultrabold (1941)
  - Twentieth Century Ultrabold Condensed (1944)
  - Twentieth Century Medium Condensed Italic (1947)
  - Twentieth Century Ultrabold Italic (1947)
- Century Bold Condensed Italic (1938), based on Benton’s Century Bold.
- New Gothic Condensed lowercase (1938)
- Slimline (1939), a knock off of Huxley Vertical.
- Onyx Italic (1939), a companion to Gerry Powell's Onyx
- Squareface (1940), a variation of Stymie Extra Bold.
- Stylescript (1940)
- Post series, commissioned by the Saturday Evening Post and based upon E.J. Kitson's hand lettering for that magazine.
  - Post Black Italic (1939)
  - Post Stout Italic (1934)
  - Ward Roman + Italic (1942), based upon Memphis Light. Privately cast for use in the Montgomery Ward catalog.
- Alternate Gothic Italic, No. 2 (1946), an italic companion to Benton’s Alternate Gothic No. 2.
- Stationers Gothic series
  - Stationers Gothic Light (1948)
  - Stationers Gothic Bold (1948)
  - Stationers Gothic Medium (1948)
- Hess New Bookbold + Italic (1948), an adaptation of Garamond Bold.
- Artscript (1948), based on the calligraphy of Domingo Maria de Servidori of Madrid from 1798.
- Cheltenham Wide Italic, a companion to Goodhue’s Cheltenham.
- Poster, also called Hess Poster.
- Hess Monoblack, never listed in regular specimen books, only on a “specimen request sheet.”

== Typefaces adapted for Monotype composition by Sol Hess ==
- Bruce Oldstyle (1902), based on a face produced by the Bruce Foundry about 1869.
  - Bruce Oldstyle Italic (1908), the first kerned italic for Monotype casting.
- Caslon series
  - English Caslon Old Style No. 37 + Italic (1903), commissioned by the Gilliss Press in Boston.
  - Caslon Old Style No. 437 + Italic, based on Stephenson Blake’s Caslon Old Face.
- Classic Hebrew (1920)
- Janson + Italic (1936), based on the thirteenth century face of Anton Janson. Adapted by Hess and Bruce Rogers.
- Laurentian (1940), a Monotype adaptation of William Dana Orcutt's Humanistic (1904, privately cast by American Type Founders for Harvard University Press). Later modified by Stephenson Blake and called Bologna, which was in turn copied by ATF and called Verona
- Goudy Bible (1941), a re-branding of Goudy’s Goudy Newstyle (1921, Village Letter Foundry). Used by Bruce Rogers and Hess for the famous Oxford Lectern Bible of 1948.
- Martin + Italic (1945), listed by Monotype as having been produced and being based on “old sources” but no specimen survives.
