= Compugraphic =

American typesetting systems company

Compugraphic Corporation
- Industry: Phototypesetting
- Founded: 1960
- Defunct: 1988
- Fate: Acquired by Agfa-Gevaert
- Successor: Agfa-Gevaert
- Key people: William Garth Jr.

Compugraphic Corporation, commonly called cg, was an American producer of typesetting systems and phototypesetting equipment, based in Wilmington, Massachusetts, a few miles from where it was founded. This company is distinct from Compugraphics, a British company founded 1967 in Aldershot, UK that specializes in the production of photomasks used in the production of integrated circuits. In 1981, Compugraphic was acquired by European competitor Agfa-Gevaert, and its products and processes merged into those of Agfa. By 1988, the merger was complete and the Compugraphic brand was removed from the market.

Along with AM/Varityper and Mergenthaler, Compugraphic was at the vanguard of what was then considered to be a revolution in the graphic arts: cold type. Prior to computerized typesetting systems such as those manufactured by Compugraphic, typography for magazines, newspapers and advertising was set using Linotype machines, which physically placed metal type forms (not unlike those found within manual typewriters) in line to form the headlines and text of their subjects. This was known as hot type.

The emergence of cold type paralleled the development of web offset presses, particularly for newspapers, in the latter part of the 20th century. The combination of cold type and offset presses dramatically reduced the expense of publishing a newspaper, especially labor costs. Harris and Goss were two companies that led in the development of web offset presses. The Goss Community press, which is still in production as of 2014, was an affordable solution for small and mid-size newspapers, and they frequently bought Compugraphic typesetting equipment at the same time.

When Compugraphic machines and their counterparts came to market, it represented a dramatic leap forward in speed and cost-efficiency and quickly made hot type technology obsolete. Cold type itself would become obsolete only a few decades later with the advent of desktop publishing and the graphics capabilities of Apple Macintosh, Commodore Amiga and Windows PC computers and the software that was developed for them by Adobe, Aldus, and others.

Compugraphic was founded in 1960 by William Garth Jr. in Brookline, Massachusetts. Along with Garth, Ellis Hanson and David Lunquist came from Photon, Corp. at the same time. Shortly thereafter, Earl Fortini joined the firm. The first hourly employee, with a Clock Number 1, was Leslie A. Clark.

The first product developed was the DTP, the Directory Tape Processor, an electro-mechanical machine, the size of a small upright freezer, and sold to publishers of telephone books.

In 1963, Compugraphic moved to North Reading and commissioned Massachusetts-based Wang Laboratories to develop the Linasec, a computer used to prepare justified punched tape to drive linotype typesetting machines which were widely used in the printing industry, which at that time was based entirely on hot metal type.

In the late 1960s, Compugraphic introduced the 7200 and 2900 photocomposition machines. Prepared by a computer, a tape would be fed into a phototypesetter, which would imprint type from a strip of film onto Kodak-made Ektamatic (light-sensitive) paper, which would then be used for paste up. As the development of its systems progressed, Compugraphic continually included new technology such as larger CRT monitors, floppy-disk storage, and screen preview capabilities. Its most prolific product was the EditWriter, which could image onto photo paper up to 8 inches wide, could create type in sizes from 6 to 72 points by using various fixed lenses mounted on an internal turret, and stored information on 8" floppy disks.

Following the success of the EditWriter, Compugraphic introduced the Modular Composition System (MCS). The entire system was modular, including the software, which was delivered on 5" floppy disks. As the product matured, a "WYSIWYG" (what-you-see-is-what-you-get) display was added (the PreView) so that a user could see a soft view of a job before it was typeset. This was followed up by the PowerView whereby the user worked directly on a WYSIWYG display. The MCS was a huge success, and also marked a change in technology from 8bit to 16bit (Intel 8086) cpu hardware.

Offered along with the MCS input side were three output devices: The top-of-the-line 8600 CRT typesetter, the smaller 8400 CRT typesetter, and the entry level 8200. The 8600 was remarkable in many ways, but foremost was its digital font processor system using a dedicated AMD bit-sliced processing system. This with its wide flat CRT made it a remarkably fast output device. Digitized fonts were encrypted to the individual machine, a feature of digital typefaces up until emergence of desktop publishing. The 8400 was a lower cost CRT machine, replacing the rather expensive 8" (and later 12") wide CRT of the 8600, with a small moveable 5" CRT that was positioned across its printing window as required. The low-cost 8200 was based on "spinning-font" and xenon flash-tube technology, very similar to the deprecated EditWriter and Compuwriter products. 8200 typefaces were images on a spinning disk, and a flash-tube fired at the appropriate moment to generate an image on the typesetting media. Most of this machine was made of plastic parts which were not unknown to break or warp.

Compugraphic also offered a version of CPM/86 runnable on the MCS hardware, along with WordStar, CalcStar and an accounting package.

In 1978, Compugraphic developed the AdVantage, which enabled operators to manipulate newspaper and magazine ad type on a display screen using an electronic pen, continuing to make life faster, easier and less expensive for their customers.

In the 1980s the Teletypesetting Co. developed a hardware and software interface that allowed Compugraphic phototypesetting machines to connect to personal computers such as the Macintosh.

In 1987, a U.S. patent for Intellifont, a system of hinted scaling computer fonts, was granted to Thomas B. Hawkins of Compugraphic.

In the trading quarter to September 30, 1987, Compugraphic reported revenue of some $92 million. In 1988, the company was acquired by the European image processing company Agfa-Gevaert, at the time a division of Bayer; for a time in the 1990s the Agfa branding was minimized in the U.S. in favor of the Bayer branding. In 1999 Agfa was separated from Bayer in an initial public offering and Compugraphic assets largely remained with the newly independent Agfa company. Today, much of what was the Compugraphic business is part of Agfa's Offset Solutions division, including prepress, computer-to-plate, and film recorder equipment product lines that are a continuation of Compugraphic's products.

In 1990, printer and computing system manufacturer Hewlett-Packard adopted Intellifont scaling as part of its PCL 5 printer control protocol.
