= Monotype Imaging =

American typesetting and typeface design company

- Formerly: Lanston Monotype Machine Company (1887–1936); Monotype Corporation (1936–1999); Agfa Monotype Corporation (1999–2004)
- Type: Private
- Traded as: Nasdaq: TYPE
- Industry: machinery industry and plant construction pre-press and pre-media services
- Founded: 1887; 139 years ago (as Lanston Monotype Machine Company); Philadelphia, Pennsylvania, U.S.
- Headquarters: Woburn, Massachusetts, U.S.
- Key people: Ninan Chacko (CEO)
- Products: Fonts
- Parent: HGGC
- Subsidiaries: Linotype GmbH; International Typeface Corporation; Ascender Corporation; Bitstream Inc.; FontShop; Fontsmith; Hoefler & Co.; URW Type Foundry; Fontworks; Colophon Foundry
- Website: www.monotype.com

Monotype Imaging Holdings Inc., founded as Lanston Monotype Machine Company in 1887 in Philadelphia by Tolbert Lanston, is an American (historically Anglo-American) company that specializes in digital typesetting and typeface design for use with consumer electronics devices. Based in Woburn, Massachusetts, the company has been responsible for many developments in printing technology—in particular the Monotype machine, which was a fully mechanical hot metal typesetter, that produced texts automatically, all single type. Monotype was involved in the design and production of many typefaces in the 20th century. Monotype developed many of the most widely used typeface designs, including Times New Roman, Gill Sans, and Arial.

Via acquisitions including Linotype GmbH, International Typeface Corporation, Bitstream, FontShop, URW, Hoefler & Co., Fontsmith, Fontworks and Colophon Foundry, the company has gained the rights to major font families including Helvetica, ITC Franklin Gothic, Optima, ITC Avant Garde, Palatino, FF DIN and Gotham. It also owns MyFonts, used by many independent font design studios. The company is owned by HGGC, a private equity firm.

== History ==
=== Monotype System ===
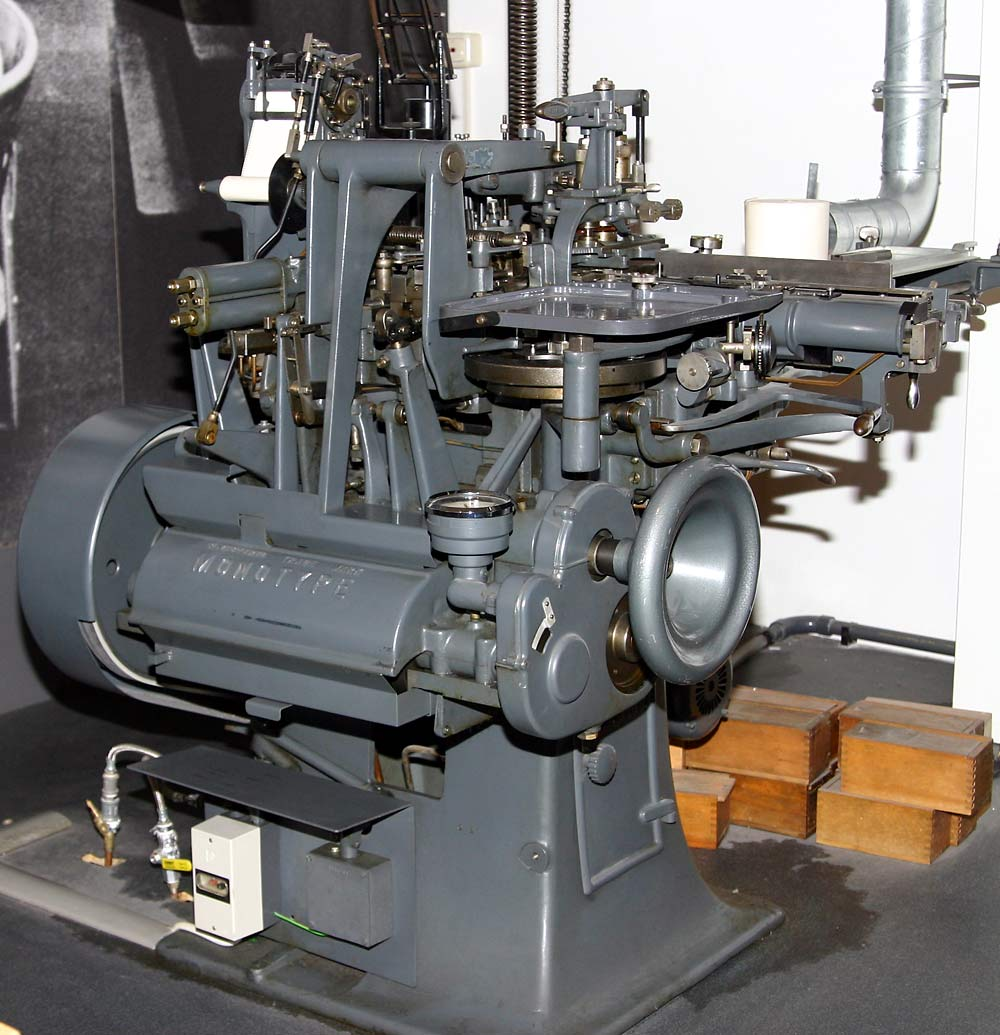
Monotype caster

The Lanston Monotype Machine Company was founded by Tolbert Lanston in Philadelphia, Pennsylvania, in 1887. Lanston had a patented mechanical method of punching out metal types from cold strips of metal which were set (hence typesetting) into a matrix for the printing press. In 1896, Lanston patented the first hot metal typesetting machine and Monotype issued Modern Condensed, its first typeface. The licenses for the Lanston type library have been acquired by P22, a digital type foundry based in Rochester, New York.

In a search for funding, the company set up a branch in London around 1897 under the name Lanston Monotype Corporation Ltd, generally known as the Monotype Corporation. In 1899, a new factory was built in Salfords near Redhill in Surrey where it has been located for over a century. The company was of sufficient size to justify the construction of its own Salfords railway station.

The Monotype machine worked by casting letters from "hot metal" (molten metal) as pieces of type. Thus spelling mistakes could be corrected by adding or removing individual letters. This was particularly useful for "quality" printing – such as books. In contrast, the Linotype machine—a direct competitor—formed a complete line of type in one bar. Editing these required replacing an entire line (and if the replacement ran onto another line, the rest of the paragraph). But Linotype slugs were easier to handle if moving a complete section of text around a page. This was more useful for "quick" printing – such as newspapers.

The typesetting machines were continually improved in the early years of the 20th century, with a typewriter style keyboard for entering the type being introduced in 1906. This arrangement addressed the need to vary the space between words so that all lines were the same length.

The keyboard operator types the copy, each key punching holes in a roll of paper tape that will control the separate caster. A drum on the keyboard indicates to the operator the space required for each line. This information is also punched in the paper. Before fitting the tape to the caster it is turned over so that the first holes read on each line set the width of the variable space. The subsequent holes determine the position of a frame, or die case, that holds the set of matrices for the face being used. Each matrix is a rectangle of bronze recessed with the shape of the letter. Once the matrix is positioned over the mould that forms the body of the type being cast, molten type metal is injected.

To promote its image, the company ran a magazine, the Monotype Recorder, over most of the twentieth century, and also ran a compositor (typesetter operator) training school in London. In 1936, the company was floated on the London Stock Exchange and became the Monotype Corporation Ltd. Board members of the company included future Prime Minister Harold Macmillan, Vice-Chairman, and other businessmen connected to publishing.

=== Typefounding ===
A sample of various Monotype designs in digital format

Monotype's role in design history is not merely due to their supply of printing equipment but due to their commissioning of many of the most important typefaces of the twentieth century.

The company's first face, issued in 1896, was a rather generic design, now named Modern, influenced by Bodoni and Scotch Roman designs. However, by the 1920s, the company's British branch was well known for commissioning popular, historically influenced designs that revived some of the best typefaces of the past, with particular attention to the early period of printing from the Renaissance to the late eighteenth century. This series of releases was a major part of the typographic renaissance of the period, an expansion of the Arts and Crafts movement interest in printing into the more workaday world of general-purpose printing. Key executives of the company in this period included historian and adviser Stanley Morison, publicity manager Beatrice Warde, engineering expert Frank Hinman Pierpont and draughtsman Fritz Stelzer (the latter two both recruited from the German printing industry, although Pierpont was American), under managing director William Isaac Burch, who led the company from 1924 to 1942. Despite tensions within the company, particularly between the historically minded faction of Morison and Warde and Pierpont in Salfords, notable typefaces commissioned included Gill Sans, Times New Roman and Perpetua, and the company maintained high standards of development allowing it to produce designs with good spacing, careful adaptation of the same basic design to different sizes and even color on the page, essential qualities for balanced body text.

Historian James Mosley, who worked closely with Monotype in the 1950s and onwards, has commented:

The English Monotype Corporation of the interwar years looks in retrospect rather like one of the great public bodies of the period, for example the British Broadcasting Corporation or London Transport... benevolent monopolies ruled by autocrats who revelled in the role of patron of the arts on a scale exceeding that of Italian Renaissance princes.

Monotype enjoyed, in Britain at least, something approaching a monopoly in book and better-quality magazine typesetting.. .Monotype exploited the glamor of its new typefaces... with brilliant publicity, for which Morison and his devoted young American recruit Beatrice Warde were partly responsible.

The American branch lagged behind the British in artistic reputation. Their designs are now often rather obscure, since (unlike products from the British branch) few have been made widely available through bundling with Microsoft products. The company employed Frederic Goudy on several serif font projects which were well received at the time, and on staff type designer Sol Hess, who created the geometric sans-serif Twentieth Century as a competitor to the German Futura.

=== Decline ===
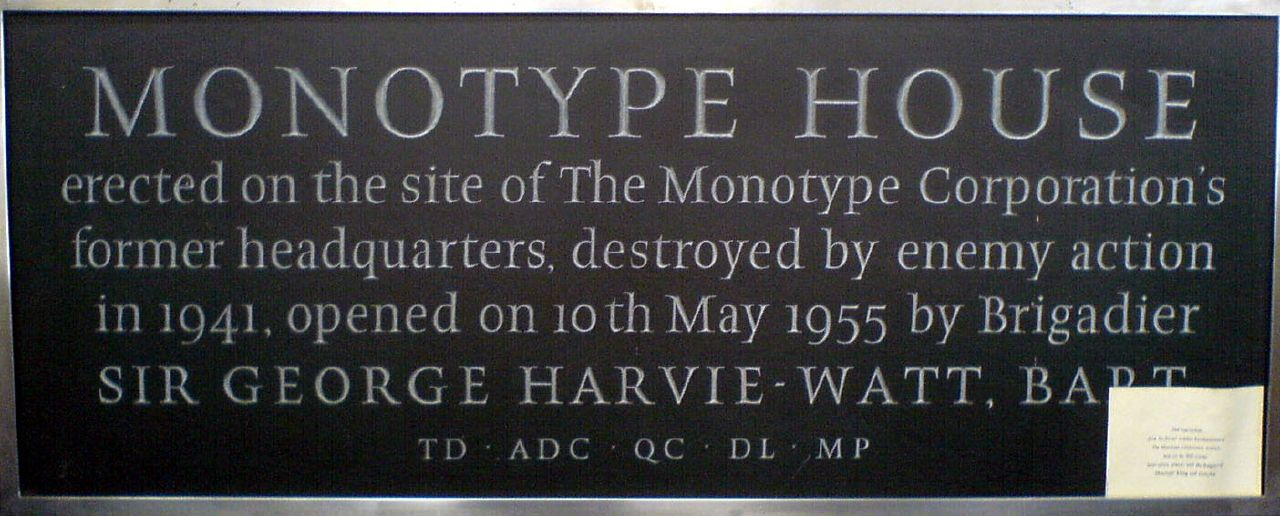
The founding-stone of the former Monotype House in London, now in the collection of the Type Archive, London

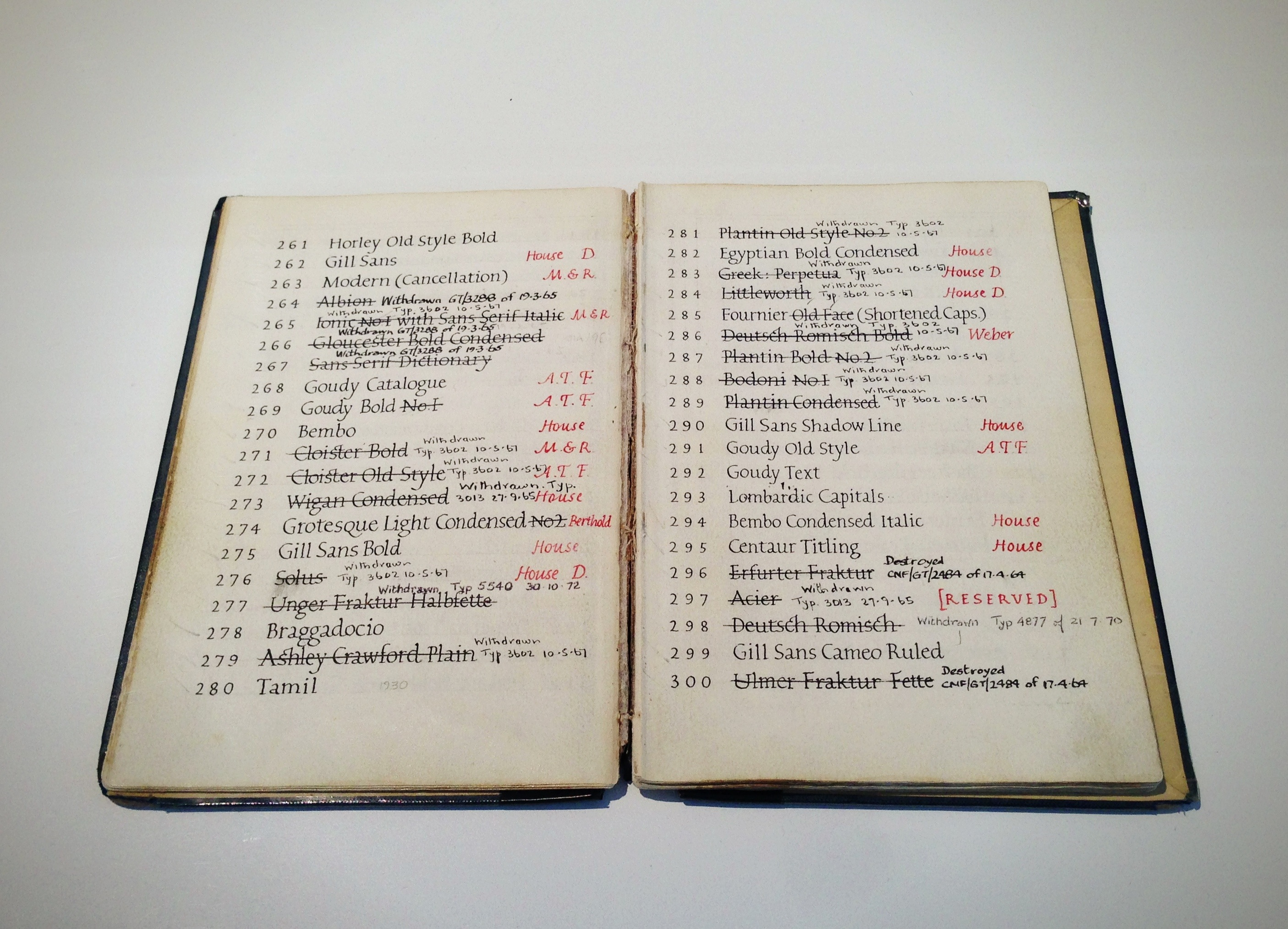
An index of typefaces issued by Monotype

Monotype entered a decline from the 1960s onwards. This was caused by the reduction in use of hot metal typesetting and replacement with phototypesetting and lithography in mass-market printing. This offered considerable efficiencies, such as no need to print books from solid metal type, quicker setting of type and a reduced number of operators needed. It also promised a more diverse and exciting range of fonts than that possible with hot metal, where it is necessary to own life-size matrices for every size of every font to be used.

Monotype made the transition to cold type and began to market its own "Monophoto" phototypesetting systems, but these suffered from problems. Its first devices were heavily based on hot metal machinery, with glass pictures of characters which would be reproduced on photographic paper replacing the matrices used to cast metal type. While this reduced the need for retraining, the resulting devices often set type slowly compared to legacy-free next-generation devices from providers such as Photon and Compugraphic, and were often more expensive. Its devices were slow to incorporate use of electronics, and while its type library was of high quality, changing tastes and the development of other companies' libraries competed with this. Its type library was also easily pirated, since fonts have only limited copyright protection. The company was eventually split into three divisions: Monotype International, which manufactured spinning mirror switched laser beam phototypesetters; Monotype Limited, which continued the hot metal machines; and Monotype Typography, which designed and sold typefaces. A research and development department was set up in Cambridge to isolate it from day to day production issues.

Monotype in the UK continued to enjoy prestige through the 1970s with the patronage of major British printers such as the university presses at Oxford and Cambridge; it also enjoyed some success with its Lasercomp laser-based typesetting system from the 1970s onwards, developed by the Cambridge research group. However, new technology and finally publishing software such as Quark XPress and Aldus PageMaker running on general-purpose computers ate away at its competitiveness in the market of complete typesetting solutions by the 1990s.

Monotype, however, has continued in business, for instance marketing typeface designs to third-party buyers, computing companies such as Microsoft (many fonts on Microsoft computers in particular are Monotype-designed) and companies and organisations such as London Transport and the UK parliament requiring custom digital typefaces. Much of its metal type equipment and archives were donated to the Type Museum collection in London; other materials are held at St Bride Library.

The history and decline of the hot metal American Lanston Monotype Corporation is described in full detail by Richard L. Hopkins, in Tolbert Lanston and the Monotype. The origin of digital Typesetting. In 2004, P22 type foundry bought the "Lanston Type Co." from Gerald Giampa.

The history of the English brand can be found in: Judy Slinn, Sebastian Carter, Richard Southall: The History of the Monotype Corporation, Vanbrugh Press & Printing historical Society, Woodstock, London, 2014, ISBN 978-0993051005

=== Consolidation, reorganization, and expansion ===
In 1992, The Monotype Corporation Ltd. appointed Administrative Receivers on 5 March and four days later Monotype Typography Ltd. was established. Cromas Holdings, an investment company based in Switzerland, bought the Monotype Corporation Ltd. and Monotype Inc. (excluding Monotype Typography) and five other direct subsidiary companies in France, Germany, Italy, the Netherlands, and Singapore. Monotype Systems Ltd. was the adopted name for the new organization with Peter Purdy as Chairman, the name Monotype was under license from Monotype Typography Ltd which retained the trademark Monotype. Monotype Systems Ltd. focused on selling pre-press software and hardware, raster image processors and workflow.

Cromas Holdings reorganized its publishing interests with the formation of the International Publishing Asset Holding Ltd. effectively controlling Monotype Systems Ltd., QED Technology Ltd., and GB Techniques Ltd.

The company acquired Berthold Communications; the UK subsidiary of the German composing equipment supplier.

In June 2002, Monotype Systems Limited was re-branded, IPA Systems Limited, as this marked the end of the existing trademark licence with Monotype Corporation. In the US Monotype Inc became alfaQuest Technologies Limited. Both companies still sell pre-press software and hardware.

In 1999, Agfa-Compugraphic acquired the company, which was renamed Agfa Monotype. In late 2004, after six years under the Agfa Corporation, the Monotype assets were acquired by TA Associates, a private equity investment firm based in Boston. The company was incorporated as Monotype Imaging, with a focus on the company's traditional core competencies of typography and professional printing.

Monotype was the first company to produce a digital version of the handwritten Persian script, Persian Nasta'liq. A Chinese "keyboard" was developed to typeset Chinese characters; it consisted of a book with a stylus. As the pages were turned, the page number was detected electrically and this was combined with the position of the character selected by the stylus on a large grid.

In 2003, the company launched Fontwise, the first software to audit desktops for licensed and unlicensed (not necessarily illegal) fonts.

On 2 October 2006, the company acquired Linotype GmbH, a subsidiary of Heidelberger Druckmaschinen.

On 18 September 2006, the company acquired China Type Design Limited, a typeface design and production company based in Hong Kong. CTDL was responsible for developing Microsoft JhengHei, the default traditional Chinese interface font for Windows Vista. The deal also secured an exclusive relationship with Creative Calligraphy Center (CCC), a font production company in Zhuhai, China, with 30 production specialists.

On 11 December 2009, the company acquired Planetweb, a developer specialized in applications and development tools for embedded devices.

On 8 December 2010, the company acquired Ascender Corporation, a provider of fonts and font technologies used in computers, mobile devices, consumer electronics and software products.

In March 2012, the company acquired Bitstream Inc., a digital font retailer. The deal also gave Monotype ownership of the MyFonts font sale website used by many independent designers and its WhatTheFont recognition service.

On 15 July 2014, the company acquired FontShop, the last large independent digital font retailer.

In October 2019 Monotype changed ownership to HGGC, a private equity firm. A few months later, on 27 January 2020, the company added FontSmith, an independent London foundry, to its font catalog.

On 18 May 2020, Monotype made another major expansion by purchasing URW Type Foundry from Global Graphics plc. In late 2021 it continued its expansion by acquiring iconic New York company Hoefler & Co. (created by Jonathan Hoefler in 1989), thus increasing its library with well-known fonts such as Gotham, Knockout, Mercury, Sentinel, Chronicle, Decimal, and Archer.

On 19 July 2023, Monotype acquired Japanese type foundry Fontworks.

On 4 May 2023, Monotype Corporation acquired 39 typefaces from the Font Bureau library, but not the company.

In 2024, Monotype acquired the rights to typefaces from US type foundry Sharp Type, but not the company.

== Controversies ==
=== Monopolisation ===
Over the years, Monotype has acquired much of its competition, which has led to criticism that the company could become a monopoly and that it was imposing increasingly expensive subscriptions on designers and artists, mainly affecting the income of independent publishers on some of the platforms it had acquired, such as MyFonts, where one of the concerns of artists was that the company was training AI on the website's database.

Following Monotype's acquisition of Hoefler & Co. in 2022, several independent designers in the United States were talking about how the company was stifling independent designers and could undermine the global font market following price increases for its fonts. Similar concerns were also raised following the acquisition of Fontworks, one of Japan's largest typography companies, where in December 2025, Japanese game developers using Fontworks' LETS font service faced "ridiculously high font license fees" that rose from USD 380 to USD 20,500 per year. At the same time, a 25,000-user cap was introduced, which was described as "completely unrealistic for most commercial [gaming] titles nowadays".

== Typeface library ==
Monotype's typeface holdings include designs historically commissioned, developed or issued by Monotype, as well as libraries acquired through the purchase of other type foundries and individual typeface collections. The company's Monotype Fonts service also distributes fonts from independent foundry partners; inclusion in that service does not necessarily indicate ownership by Monotype.

=== Historical Monotype typefaces ===
Among typefaces historically issued, commissioned or developed by Monotype are:

- Apollo
- Albertina (Chris Brand, 1966)
- Albertus (Berthold Wolpe, 1932–40)
- Albion (1910)
- Arial (Nicholas, Saunders et al., 1982)
- Ashley Crawford
- Ashley Script
- Bembo (1929)
- Blado
- Bodoni
- Bulmer
- Castellar
- Centaur (Rogers & Warde, 1929)
- Century Gothic
- Condensa
- Dante
- Dubai
- Ehrhardt
- Emerson
- Engravers
- Felix Titling
- Festival Titling
- Forte
- Fournier
- Gill Sans
- Goudy Old Style
- Horley Old Style
- Imprint
- Joanna
- Klang
- Matura
- Menhart
- Mercurius Script
- Monotype Grotesque
- OCR-B
- Octavian
- Pastonchi (1928)
- Pegasus
- Pepita
- Perpetua
- Photina
- Poliphilus
- Plantin
- Solus (Eric Gill, 1929)
- Spectrum
- Tempest Titling (Berthold Wolpe)
- Times New Roman
- Twentieth Century
- Van Dijck
- Walbaum

=== Acquired typeface libraries ===
Since the 2000s, Monotype has substantially expanded its typeface holdings through acquisitions. These have included entire foundries such as Linotype, Ascender, URW, Hoefler & Co., Fontsmith and Fontworks, as well as selected collections from independent foundries and designers.

Notable acquisitions and typeface collections include:

Year	Foundry or collection	Notable typefaces or scope
2006	Linotype	Added the Linotype library to Monotype's holdings. The library includes major families such as Helvetica, Avenir, Optima and Palatino.
2010	Ascender	Typeface and font-technology business whose library included fonts developed for computing, mobile devices and consumer electronics.
2012	Bitstream	Acquisition of Bitstream's font business, together with MyFonts and the WhatTheFont service.
2014	FontShop	Acquisition of the type retailer and its associated font business.
2020	Fontsmith	Added 70 font families, including FS Albert, FS Brabo, FS Koopman, FS Meridian, FS Millbank, FS Split and FS Untitled.
2020	URW Type Foundry	Added more than 500 families, including Corporate S Pro, Futura, Franklin Gothic, URW DIN and Nimbus Sans Global.
2021	Hoefler & Co.	More than 1,100 typeface designs, including Gotham, Knockout, Mercury, Sentinel, Chronicle, Decimal and Archer.
2023	Font Bureau collection	Thirty-nine families from The Font Bureau, including David Berlow designs such as Belizio and Bureau Grot. The transaction covered a collection of typefaces rather than the company itself.
2023	Fontworks	More than 1,000 Japanese fonts, including the Tsukushi and Matisse families, together with Fontworks' type services and business.
2023	Colophon Foundry	Acquisition of the London-based foundry, including its team, custom type-design capabilities, technology and a library of 85 font families. Notable families include Aperçu, Basis Grotesque, Fann Grotesque, Fortescue, Value Sans and Value Serif.
2024	Sharp Type collection	Twenty-seven font families, including Sharp Sans, Sharp Grotesk Global and Beatrice. Sharp Type remained an independent foundry following the collection acquisition.
2024	DSType and Kastelov collections	Monotype announced the addition of type collections from DSType and Kastelov. DSType's collection comprised 151 families and 1,555 fonts; the Kastelov collection included Nolan, Nolan Next, Intelo, Axiforma and Kinetika.
2025	Design210	Acquisition of the Seoul-based type foundry and more than 1,100 original Korean fonts.

Among the best-known typefaces now held by Monotype through these and earlier acquisitions are Helvetica, Avenir, Palatino, Optima, ITC Avant Garde, FF DIN, Gotham, Knockout, Mercury, Sentinel, Chronicle, Decimal and Archer.

== See also ==
- Linotype typesetting machine
- Monotype typefaces, hot metal typefaces
- Monotype system
- Women in Type

== Bibliography ==
- Hopkins, Richard (2012). Tolbert Lanston and the Monotype: The Origin of Digital Typesetting. Tampa, Florida: University of Tampa Press. ISBN 978-159732-100-6.
