= Information International, Inc. =

1962–2001 computer technology company

- Industry: Computer hardware Computer software Computer-generated imagery
- Founded: 1962
- Founder: Edward Fredkin
- Defunct: 2001 (acquired by Agfa-Gevaert)
- Fate: Merged with Autologic in 1996, acquired by Agfa-Gevaert in 2001
- Successor: Autologic Information International, Inc. (AIII) (1996–2001)
- Headquarters: Los Angeles, California, United States
- Number of locations: Maynard, MA, Santa Monica, CA; Culver City, CA; Los Angeles
- Area served: United States; United Kingdom
- Subsidiaries: III Motion Pictures Products Group (1974–1982)

Information International, Inc., commonly referred to as Triple-I or III, was an early computer technology company.

== Background ==
The company was founded by Edward Fredkin in 1962 in Maynard, Massachusetts. It then moved (serially) to Santa Monica, Culver City, and Los Angeles California. Triple-I merged with Autologic, Inc. in 1996, becoming Autologic Information International Inc. (AIII). The combined company was purchased by Agfa-Gevaert in 2001.

In the early 1960s, Information International Inc. contributed several articles by Ed Fredkin, Malcolm Pivar, and Elaine Gord, and others, in a major book on the programming language LISP and its applications.

Triple-I's commercially successful technology was centered around very high precision CRTs, capable of recording to film; which for a while were the publishing industry's gold standard for digital-to-film applications. The company also manufactured film scanners using special cameras fitted with photomultiplier tubes as the image sensor, for digitizing existing films and paper documents. One such successful product of theirs using their precision CRT technology was their FR-80 film recorder introduced in 1968. It was capable of recording black and white (and later color as an option) digital imagery to motion picture or still transparency film at a maximum resolution of 16384x16384, making it an ideal system for generating either Computer Output Microfilm (COM), computer-to-film negatives for making printing plates, and other computer-generated graphics.

However, Triple-I is most notable for its commercially unsuccessful ventures; a number of one-or-two of a kind systems which included CRT-based computer displays used at the Stanford AI Lab, an OCR system based on PDP-10's (two were sold), and The Foonly F-1 - which was used for movie special effects.

== OCR Systems ==
Triple-I had a very ambitious OCR group which used their core film scanning technology, graphic displays, and a custom binary image processor (BIP); all interfaced to a PDP-10 timesharing computer with much custom software. Although it was continuously under development over a period of over ten years, only two actual systems were ever sold. The first (circa 1974) was a paper-to-digital-to-paper system for reworking U.S. Navy aircraft maintenance manuals, which involved filming and scanning paper manuals, capturing the many diagrams in digital form, and reading the accompanying text. The second was a hand-print recognition system sold to the British DHSS in 1976, which captured data from benefit forms.

While none of the OCR research had any lasting impact, the use of PDP-10's directly enabled Triple-I's involvement with computer animation.

== Computer animation ==
Triple-I's work in computer animation done by the Motion Pictures Product Group, is probably the most notable first from Triple-I, at least if measured by the eventual success of the technology. They created some of the first computer-generated special effects for major motion pictures, and employed a number of computer graphics pioneers.

Computer animators Gary Demos and John Whitney Jr. began using equipment at Triple-I in the early 1970s for animation, including the first use of computer imaging in a feature film — the "android vision" effect in Westworld. In 1974, Demos and Whitney convinced Triple-I to establish the Motion Pictures Product Group. In 1976, they scanned and animated Peter Fonda's head for Futureworld, the first appearance of 3D computer graphics in a film. They created an early demo animation called "Adam Powers, The Juggler"; this animation was later used in Miramar's short film All Shapes and Sizes as well as referenced by Pixar's short film Red's Dream. They were also responsible for effects in the film Looker, and animation tests for films such as Close Encounters of the Third Kind and Star Wars.

Circa 1976, prior to becoming an artist-in-residence at the Jet Propulsion Laboratory, pioneering computer artist David Em spent nights at Triple-I for eighteen months, learning to use their systems and create his first 3D, shaded, digital imagery.

When Disney began production of the 1982 film Tron, they hired four companies to create the 2D computer animation — Triple-I, MAGI, Robert Abel and Associates, and Digital Effects. Triple-I and MAGI were responsible for the majority of the roughly thirty minutes of computer animation. Triple-I created the Master Control Program, the Solar Sailer, and Sark's Carrier. Whitney and Demos left before the end of work on Tron, to found Digital Productions. Partly due to their departure, Triple-I was unable to complete as much of the effects as planned, and MAGI took over some of the work.

Triple-I sponsored the construction of the Foonly F-1, the fastest PDP-10 ever made. Jim Blinn, Frank Crow, and others developed the company's rendering software TRANEW for the Foonly. Craig Reynolds created the Actor/Scriptor Animation System (ASAS), a procedural animation language based on LISP, at the MIT Architecture Machine Group, and then at Triple-I integrated it into their Digital Scene Simulation System. Larry Malone developed 3D modeling software for the Tektronix 4014 display. Tom McMahon developed a memory-mapped thousand line RGB framebuffer for the Foonly, one of the earliest framebuffers in that class.

In 1982, the management of Triple-I decided to shut down the Motion Pictures Product Group.

== Electronic pre-press ==
Triple-I was also heavily involved in electronic pre-press systems. Its Automated Illustrated Documentation System, or AIDS, produced technical documents, initially for the aerospace industry. The company manufactured a variety of output devices that could create entire pages with graphic to Microfiche, 16 or 35mm films or truesize film. Later this technology was adopted by Time and Newsweek magazines.

In 1982, this technology produced another first for Triple-I when the Pasadena Star-News became the first newspaper to produce full pages electronically, a process of pagination that is now universal among large dailies worldwide. The system was renamed NPS, for Newspaper Publishing System, which The Wall Street Journal later used an adapted version to produce the first "computer-to-plate" system, whereby computer technology produced printing plates that could be mounted on newspaper presses. But Triple-I missed several technology changes which caused its downturn in the 1990s.
