= Elsner+Flake =

German type foundry

- Company type: Private
- Industry: Type design
- Founded: 1986; 40 years ago
- Founders: Veronika Elsner; Günther Flake
- Headquarters: Hamburg, Germany
- Website: www.elsner-flake.com

Elsner+Flake is a trademark used by German type foundry originally called EF Designstudios, but later renamed Elsner+Flake Type Consulting GmbH, and is currently based in Hamburg. The company was founded in 1986 by Veronika Elsner and Günther Flake after their ten-year freelance experience in type design, typography and digitizing of fonts and logos.

The collection of digital fonts by Elsner+Flake numbers more than 2500. The fonts are available in Mac PostScript, PC PostScript, PC TrueType and Plain OpenType.
