= Caledonia (typeface) =

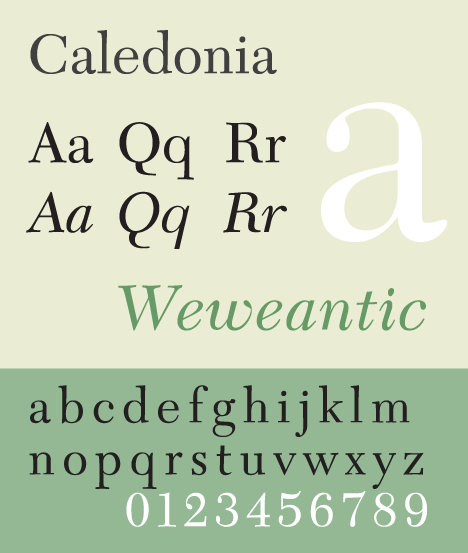
- Category: Serif
- Classification: Transitional serif
- Designer(s): William Addison Dwiggins
- Foundry: Mergenthaler Linotype Company
- Date released: 1938
- Design based on: Scotch Roman; Bulmer
- Variations: New Caledonia
- Also known as: Cornelia; Transitional 511

Caledonia is a serif typeface designed by William Addison Dwiggins in 1938 for the Mergenthaler Linotype Company and commonly used in book design. As a transitional serif design, one inspired by the Scotch Roman typefaces of the early nineteenth century, Caledonia has a contrasting design of alternating thick and thin strokes, a design that stresses the vertical axis and sharp, regular serifs on ascenders and descenders.

Dwiggins chose the name Caledonia, the Roman name for Scotland, to express the face's basis on Scotch Roman typefaces. However, though Dwiggins began with the thought of copying the classical Scotch Romans, eventually he drew more inspiration from the Bulmer design of William Martin. The G is open and the R has a curved tail. The t is unbracketed. Italic characters p and q have no foot serif. The character set, as drawn by Dwiggins, was wide, including ranging (old style) figures, lining figures, and small capitals in the text and bold weights. A Greek version of the face is available. Historian of printing G. Willem Ovink describes Caledonia as "one of the most crisp and sprightly modern types".

== Hot metal type ==
=== Machine composition ===
Caledonia was made initially for machine composition with foundry type only made later, and then only in Germany. The following variants were designed by Dwiggins and released by Linotype:

- Caledonia + Italic (1938)
- Caledonia Bold + Bold Italic (1940)

Two versions of the typeface were commercially available: one, with longer descenders (preferred by the designer), was cast on larger type bodies than the nominal point size, resulting in wider line spacing, while the other, with shorter descenders, was designed for use at nominal size and could be set solid. The roman (paired with either bold or italic) and bold (paired with bold italic) were available in 6–12 and 14 point; the bold was also available in 16, 18, 21, 24, 27, 30 and 36 point display sizes with short descenders only, and paired with an optional bold italic at 18 and 24 point. Linotype also made 36 point matrices for Caledonia Bold Condensed, but it is doubtful that Dwiggins had anything to do with their design. The face was sold by Linotype in England under the same name, and in Germany as Cornelia.

=== Foundry type ===
Cornelia, as it was called in Germany, proved so popular there that the Stempel Foundry cast it as foundry type.

== Cold type ==
Caledonia's popularity as a text face continued right through the cold type era. Linotype offered Caledonia for its Linofilm system, making several modifications to the design, most noticeably an "f" that kerned now that it was no longer limited to the capabilities of the Linotype machine; these modifications have carried over to the digital version. Caledonia roman was also made available in display optical sizes.

Phototypesetting also made unauthorized copies easier than ever to produce, and knockoffs from other companies were sold under the following names:

- Caledonia — Monotype (the only authorized copy)
- Caledo — Alphatype
- Highland — Autologic, Dymo, Star/Photon, Varityper
- Balmoral — Autologic, Berthold, Harris, Varityper.
- California — Compugraphic
- CaledonStar — Star/Photon
- Edinburgh — Graphic Systems Inc.
- Laurel — Harris, MGD Graphic Systems
- Calderon — Scangraphic
- Gael — Information International Inc.

== Digital copies ==
- A digital version, called New Caledonia, was designed by David Berlow and released in PostScript format by Adobe and Linotype in 1988. New Caledonia replaced an early digital Caledonia for Linotype's proprietary typesetting systems that, owing to the technical limitations of the time, was apparently infamous for obliterating most of the typeface's defining attributes. It is available in four weights: text, semibold, bold, and black, each with small capitals and both lining and old-style numerals. It is largely a direct tracing of one of the larger optical sizes for photocomposition, with its characteristic kerning lowercase "f", which was not possible on the Linotype machine. New Caledonia uses the longer descenders from the metal Caledonia.
- Bitstream digitized Caledonia as Transitional 511. It features only two weights, regular and bold, with accompanying italics, and has a much smaller character set than the Linotype/Adobe version, lacking both small capitals and old-style figures. The shorter descender lengths from the metal Caledonia are used.
- Time Caledonia, a proprietary version for Time magazine, was designed by Matthew Carter in 1994. It is more robust than other available digital versions, which suffer from the "emaciated" appearance of many early digitizations of existing fonts that make them less suited to running text, but it is not available for commercial licensing.

== Derivatives ==
- Whitman, designed by Kent Lew at Font Bureau and released in 2003, combines the basic structure of Caledonia in the roman with elements of Eric Gill's Joanna, and has an italic in between the two extremes. Lew would later contribute the hand-lettering for the spine of W.A. Dwiggins: A Life in Design, Bruce Kennett's 2018 Dwiggins biography.
- Déréon, designed by Jean François Porchez in 2005 for Beyoncé Knowles's "House of Déréon" fashion line, is based on Caledonia but incorporates influences from a number of different time periods and type styles, reflecting the eclectic influences on Beyoncé's music. It is not currently commercially available.
