= Scotch Roman =

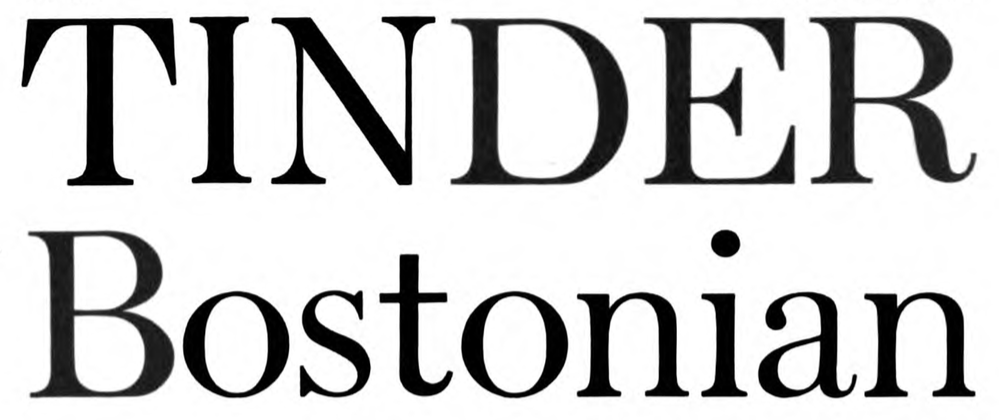
- Category: Serif
- Designers: William Miller, Richard Austin
- Foundry: William Miller

Scotch Roman is a class of typefaces popular in the early nineteenth century, particularly in the United States and to a lesser extent the United Kingdom. These typefaces were modeled on a design known as Pica No. 2 from the Edinburgh foundry of William Miller. Some accounts suggest that Miller's type, the oldest surviving specimen of which dates to 1813, was cut by Richard Austin, who had previously produced the Bell types for the British Letter Foundry.

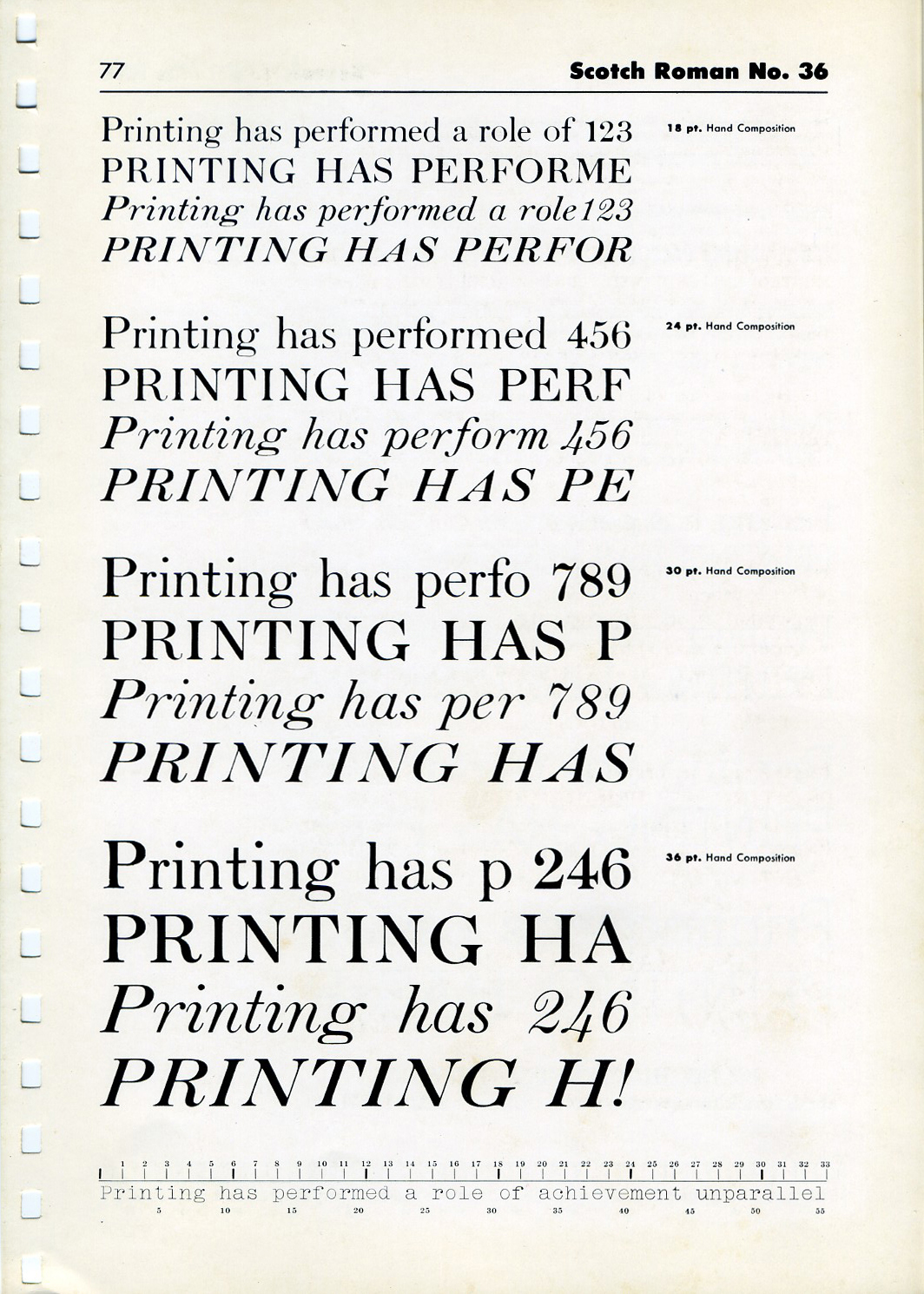
A twentieth century Scotch Roman type specimen in metal type

The name "Scotch Roman", which entered use in the United States late in the same century, was applied to a slightly modified recasting of Miller's type by the A.D. Farmer foundry of New York. It is believed to derive from "Scotch-face", a term which was originally used by a different type designed in 1839 by typefounder Samuel Nelson Dickinson of Boston, and cast for him by Alexander Wilson and Son in Glasgow.

Versions of Scotch Roman were subsequently released by a number of other typefoundries, including both Linotype and Monotype, in the early twentieth century. These were generally derived from the A.D. Farmer design, and shared with it a number of modifications such as a flat-topped lowercase t.

Scotch Roman typefaces are a serif font, suitable for both body text and large text such as headings. De Vinne described Scotch Roman as "a small, neat, round letter, with long ascenders, and not noticeably condensed or compressed." They can be classified as "modern" from their large ball terminals, horizontal serifs, sharply vertical axis and high stroke contrast. Nonetheless, Scotch Romans have a number of differences from the styles of Bodoni and Didot that are often held to typify the modern genre: the serifs, while very broad and flat, remain bracketed, apertures are frequently narrow, and stroke widths tend to be slightly more modulated.

These typefaces were extremely influential on many modern typefaces, including Caledonia, Georgia, and Escrow (commissioned by The Wall Street Journal). Miller, by Matthew Carter, is a modern revival of the Scotch Roman genre. Scotch Modern is a redrawing of an American version of Miller's design, said by designer Nick Shinn to be closer to a Didone, and hence a Scotch Modern rather than a Scotch Roman.
