= Didone (typography) =

Classification of serif typefaces

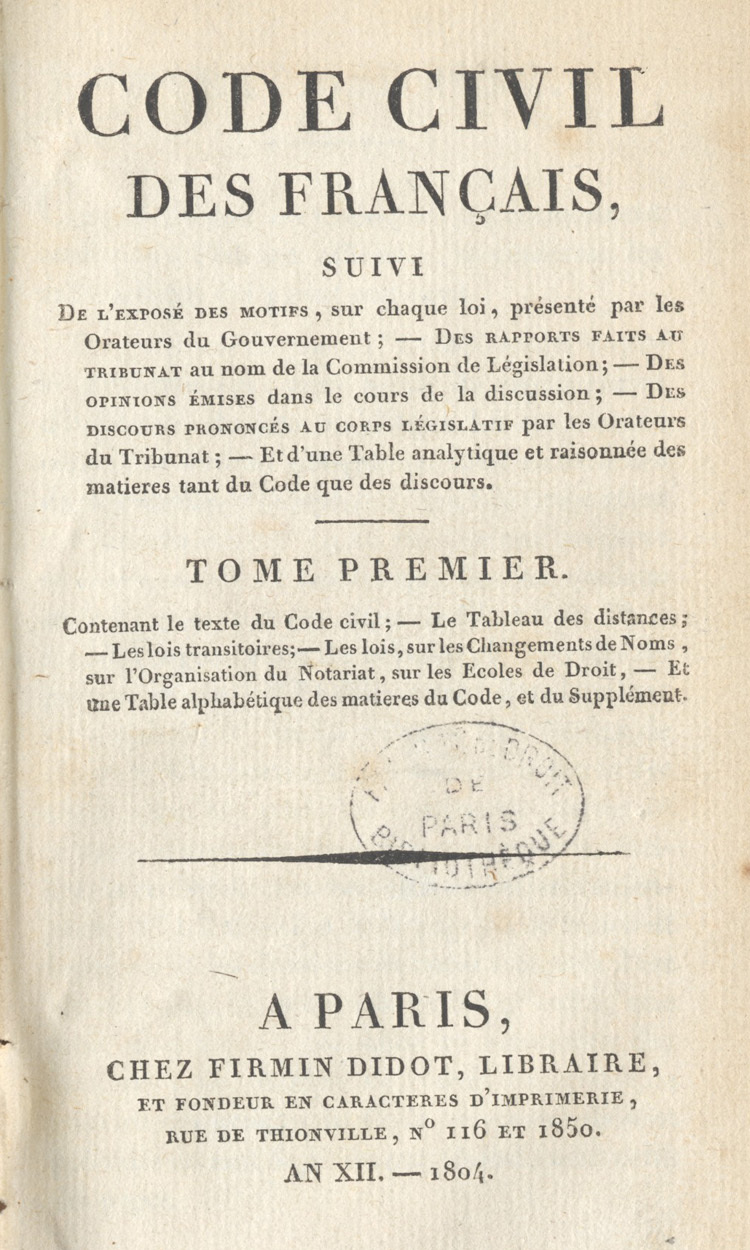
Didot's type in the Code civil des Français, printed by the company of Firmin Didot in 1804

Didone (/diˈdoʊni/) is a genre of serif typeface that emerged in the late 18th century and was the standard style of general-purpose printing during the 19th century. It is characterized by:

- Narrow and unbracketed (hairline) serifs. (The serifs have a nearly constant width along their length.)
- Vertical orientation of weight axes. (The vertical strokes of letters are thick.)
- Strong contrast between thick and thin lines. (Horizontal parts of letters are thin in comparison to the vertical parts.)
- Some stroke endings show ball terminals. (Many lines end in a teardrop or circle shape, rather than a plain wedge-shaped serif.)
- An unornamented, "modern" appearance.

The term "Didone" is a 1954 coinage, part of the Vox-ATypI classification system. It amalgamates the surnames of the famous typefounders Firmin Didot and Giambattista Bodoni, whose efforts defined the style around the beginning of the nineteenth century. The category was known in the period of its greatest popularity as modern or modern face, in contrast to "old-style" or "old-face" designs, which date to the Renaissance period.

== History ==
The typeface Centaur, based on 1470s Venetian printing. The narrowest part of the stroke is at top left/bottom right, so the axis is diagonal and the contrast low. Below, Bodoni. The contrast has been increased and the axis of the contrast made vertical.

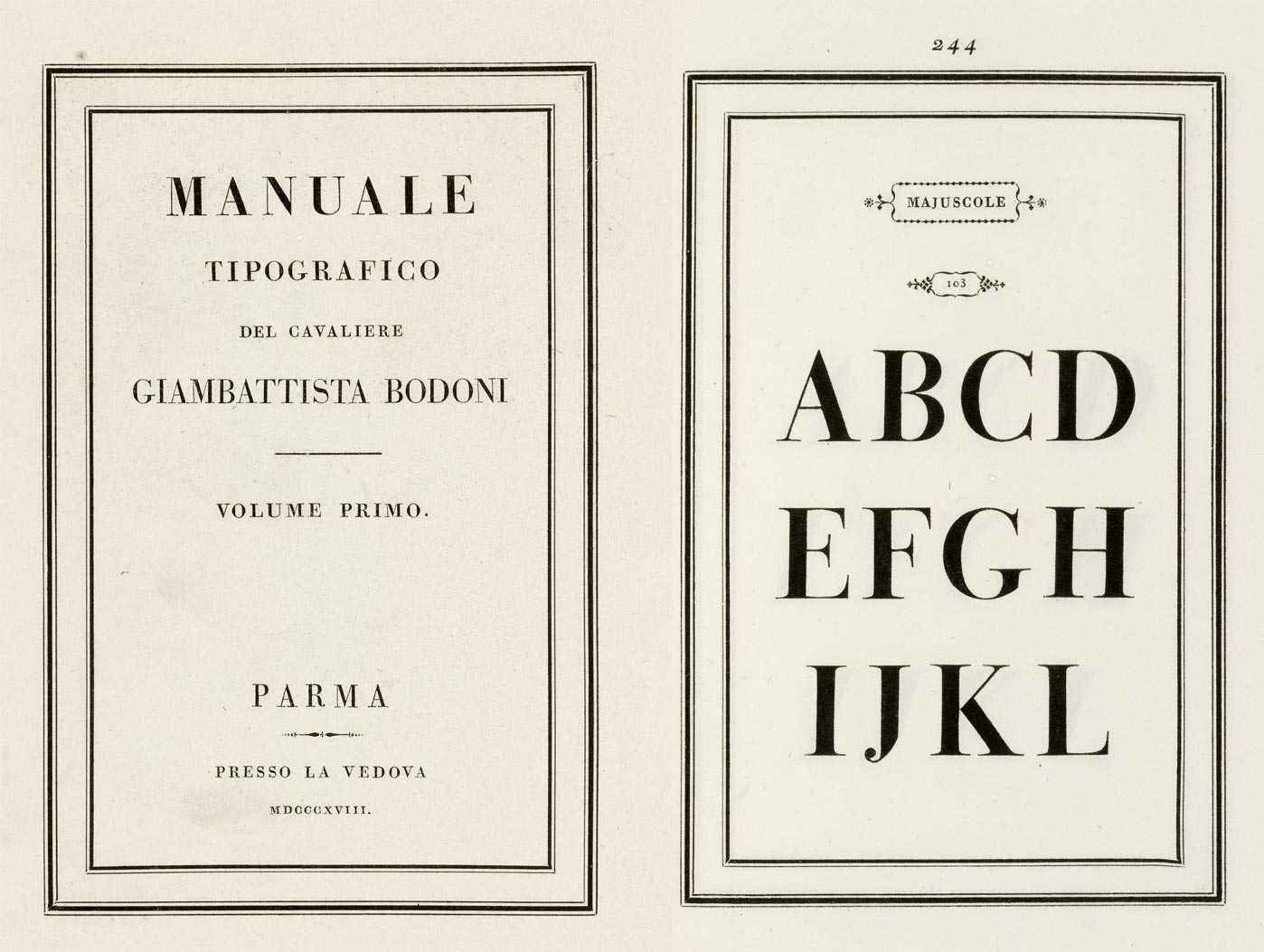
Two pages from Bodoni's Manuale Tipografico, a posthumous showcase of his work and engraving by his wife

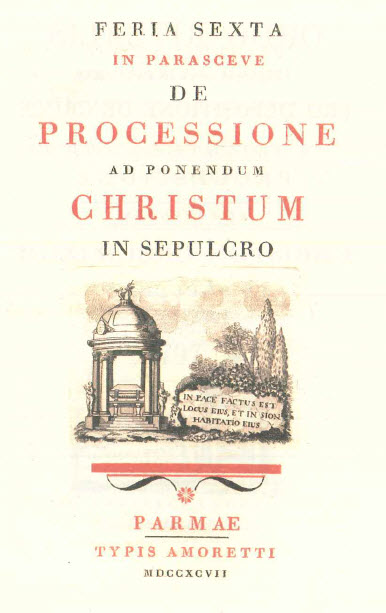
Types by the Amoretti Brothers

Didone types were developed by printers including Firmin Didot, Giambattista Bodoni and Justus Erich Walbaum, whose eponymous typefaces, Bodoni, Didot, and Walbaum, remain in use today. Their goals were to create more elegant designs of printed text, developing the work of John Baskerville in Birmingham and Fournier in France towards a more extreme, precise design with intense precision and contrast, that could show off the increasingly refined printing and paper-making technologies of the period. (Lettering along these lines was already popular with calligraphers and copperplate engravers, but much printing in western Europe up to the end of the eighteenth century used typefaces designed in the sixteenth century or relatively similar, conservative designs.) These trends were also accompanied by changes to page layout conventions and the abolition of the long s. Typefounder Talbot Baines Reed, speaking in 1890 called the new style of the early nineteenth century "trim, sleek, gentlemanly, somewhat dazzling". Their designs were popular, aided by the striking quality of Bodoni's printing, and were widely imitated.

In Britain and America, the lasting influence of Baskerville led to the creation of types such as the Bell, Bulmer and Scotch Roman designs, in the same spirit as Didone fonts from the continent but less geometric; these like Baskerville's type are often called transitional serif designs. (Note: Note that the classification of typefaces as "transitional" is somewhat nebulous. Eliason (2015) provides a modern assessment of the limitations of this classification.) Later developments of the latter class have been called Scotch Modern and show increasing Didone influence.

Didone typefaces came to dominate printing by the middle of the nineteenth century, although some "old style" faces continued to be sold and new ones developed by typefounders. From around the 1840s onwards, interest began to develop among artisanal printers in the typefaces of the past.

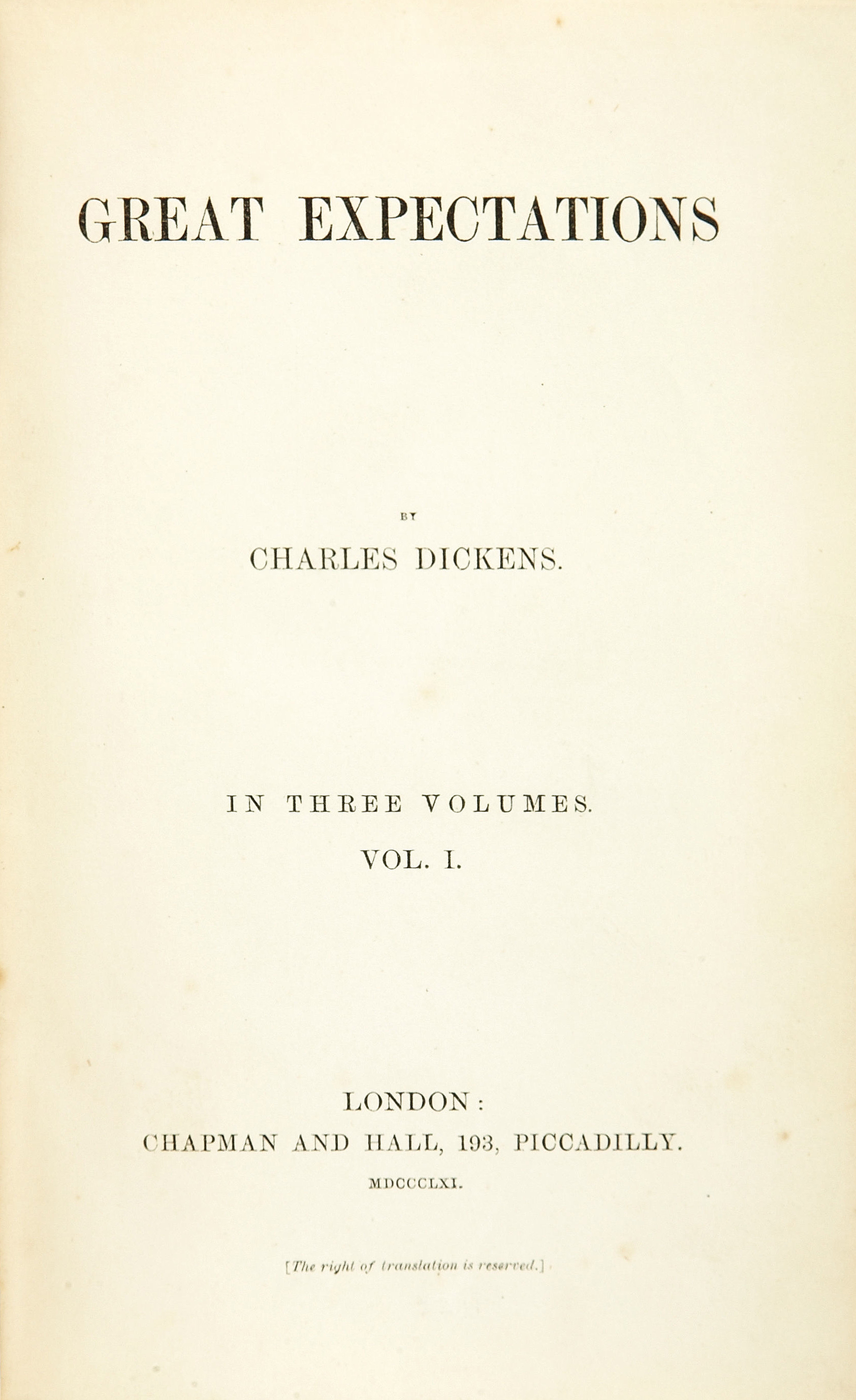
The 1861 title page of Great Expectations in the sharp, high-contrast Didone type of the period. Popular at the time, the style had disappeared almost completely by the middle of the twentieth century.

Many historians of printing have been critical of the later Didone faces popular in general-purpose printing of the nineteenth century, especially following the reaction of the twentieth century against Victorian styles of art and design. Nicolete Gray has described later Didone typefaces as depressing and unpleasant to read: "the first modern faces designed around 1800 and 1810 are charming; neat, rational and witty. But from that time onwards nineteenth-century book types grow more and more depressing; the serifs grow longer, the ascenders and descenders grow longer, the letters crowd together; the normal mid nineteenth-century book is typographically dreary. The Victorians lost the idea of good type to read." Historian G. Willem Ovink has described late nineteenth-century Didone types as "the most lifeless, regular types ever seen". Stanley Morison of the printing equipment company Monotype, a leading supporter of the revival of "old-style" and transitional typefaces, wrote in 1937 of the eighteen-fifties being a time of "batteries of bold, bad faces" and said that "the types cut between 1810 and 1850 represent the worst that have ever been."

== Display derivatives ==
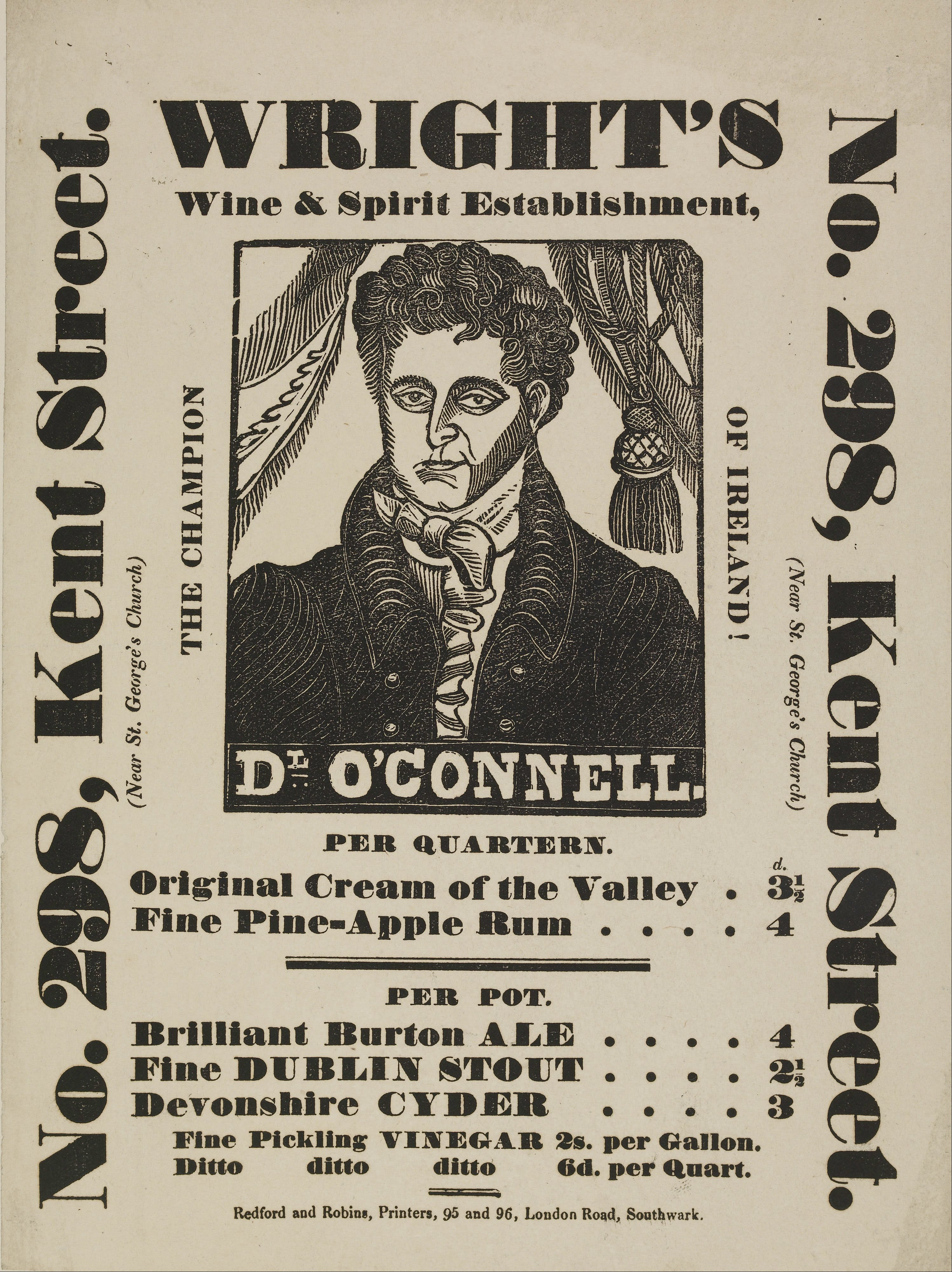
Fat-face type on a poster, London, c. 1840s

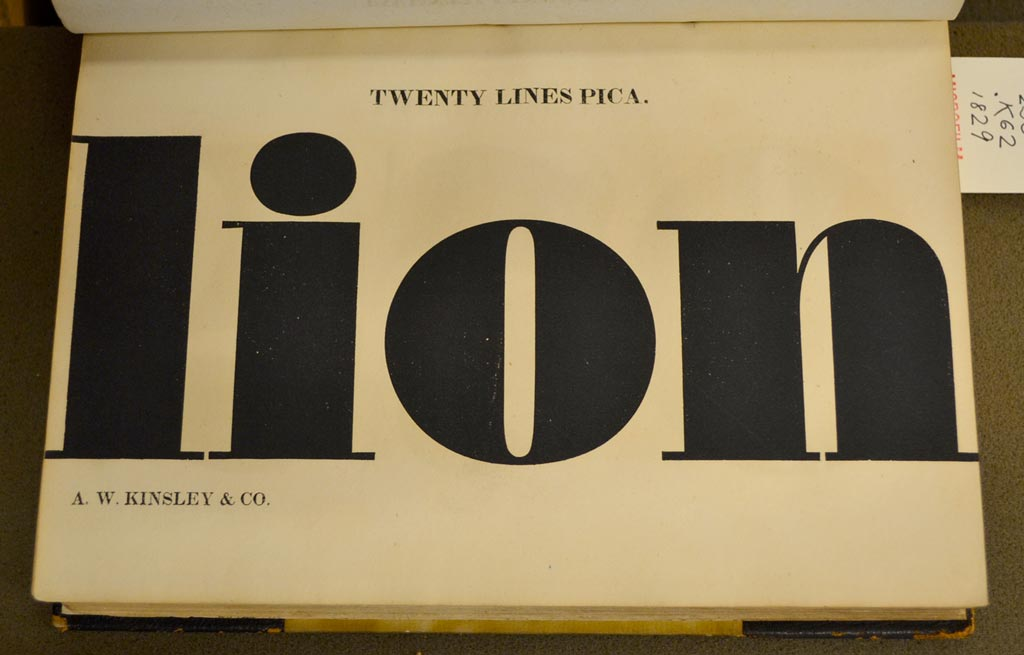
An ultra-bold Didone "fat face" from the A.W. Kinsley & Co. foundry, Albany, 1829. Similar designs, more or less inspired by typefaces, were used on gravestones in the northern USA.

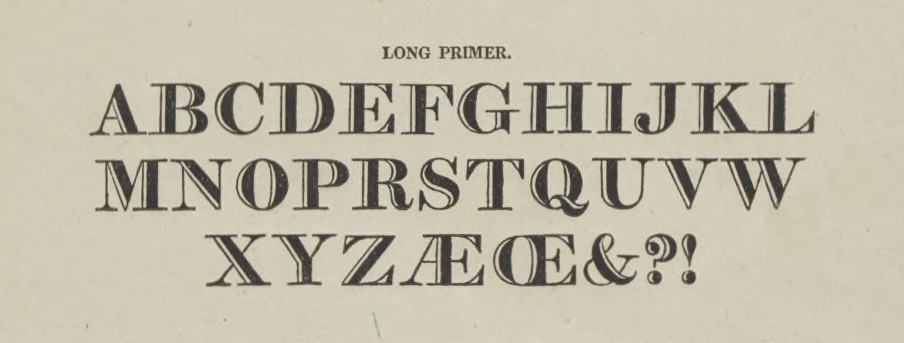
A bold inline modern face in a specimen issued by William Caslon IV

Driven by the increasing popularity of advertising, whether printed or custom lettering, the beginning of the nineteenth century saw the development of bold lettering and the arrival of types of letterform that were not simply larger versions of body text faces. These included the sans-serif, slab-serif and new styles of bold blackletter, but also Didone-style letters that emboldened or decorated the roman type form. Known as 'fat faces', these showed magnified contrast, keeping the thin parts of the letter slender while magnifying the vertical strokes massively. Other "effect" typefaces were sold such as patterned letterforms which added a pattern to the bold parts of the fat face letter, and the pre-existing inline types with a line inside the type.

== Displacement ==
Didone fonts began to decline in popularity for general use, especially in the English-speaking world, around the end of the nineteenth century. The rise of the slab serif and sans-serif genres displaced fat faces from much display use, while the revival of interest in "old-style" designs reduced its use in body text. This trend, influenced by the Arts and Crafts movement and antiquarian-minded printers such as William Morris, rejected austere, classical designs of type, ultimately in favour of gentler designs. Some of these were revivals of typefaces from between the Renaissance and the late eighteenth century such as revivals (with varying levels of faithfulness to the originals) of the work of Nicolas Jenson, William Caslon's "Caslon" typefaces and others such as Bembo and Garamond. Others such as "Old Styles" from Miller and Richard, Goudy Old Style and Imprint were new designs on the same pattern.

An early example of the distaste some printers had for the modern type style was French printer Louis Perrin, who would eventually commission some new typeface designs on a traditional model. He wrote in 1855 (tr. James Mosley):

You ask me what kind of whim leads me to revive types of the sixteen century today.... I often have to reprint old poetry [from the sixteenth century] and this task invariably makes me oddly uneasy. I cannot recognise in my proofs the verses … our present day punches, which are so precise, so correct, so regularly aligned, so mathematically symmetrical ... no doubt have their merits, but I should prefer to see them kept for printing reports on the railway.

A revival of interest in the old styles of letter in Britain around 1870 was, however, criticised by master signpainter James Callingham in his contemporary textbook on the art:

It is ... marvellous to think that, after the much desiderated correction [to letters] had been applied, an attempt should recently have been made to introduce these old irregular letters again to the public notice, for the vagaries of fashion have of late brought into use in the printing trade several kinds of old-faced types ... and the infection has in some degree been caught by the sign-writer ... we have thus, on the one hand, a hard, an irregular and unfinished letter; and on the other, a graceful, symmetrical and highly finished letter ... there is some indication that this absurdity, like all fashions that have their birth in bad taste, is happily passing away, and the modern letter is again asserting its superiority. It has always been the case in the arts that, after periods of extravaganza and bizzarerie, there has been a recurrence to sound taste. Positive retrogession is against nature and any tendency in this direction will most assuredly correct itself. The adherents of the old irregular alphabets, which were made so because scarcely anyone was capable of making them better, might just as reasonably advocate a return to the rough and unplaned machinery of the first locomotive steam engines, taking as their model the old "Puffing Billy", now so carefully preserved in the Patent Museum at South Kensington.

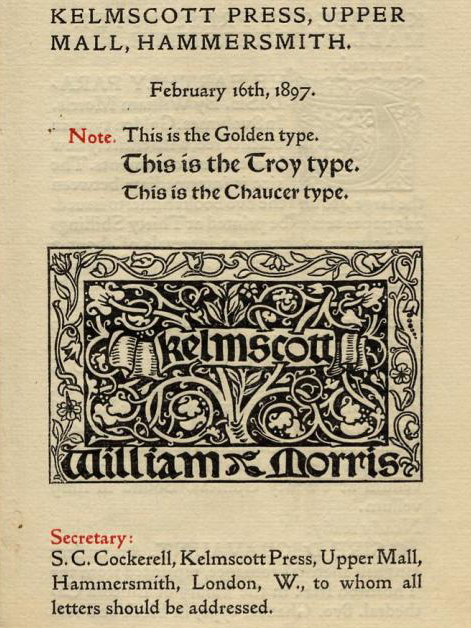
Custom typefaces of the Kelmscott Press. Its medievalist approach and custom typefaces were imitated by many printers, publishers and typefounders in the late nineteenth century.

One influential example in the late nineteenth century was William Morris's Kelmscott Press, which commissioned new custom fonts such as his Golden Type on medieval and early Renaissance models. Many fine press printers imitated his model, and while some printers such as Stanley Morison in the twentieth century found his work excessive, it was heavily imitated. Talbot Baines Reed in 1890, shortly before his company cast type for Morris, commented on a desire among typefounders to move back to earlier models: "types appeared leaning this way and that, flowery and stringy, skeleton and fat, round and square ... until it became almost a merit that the original shape was barely recognisable. I am not describing a thing of the past. Herod is out-heroded every week in some new fancy which calls itself a letter ... I do not deny that may of our modern fancy letters are graceful ... nor am I bold enough to suggest that at this time of day they can be dispensed with. But I admit to some misgivings at the lengths to which the craze is carrying us, and the almost total abandonment of traditional models which it involves."

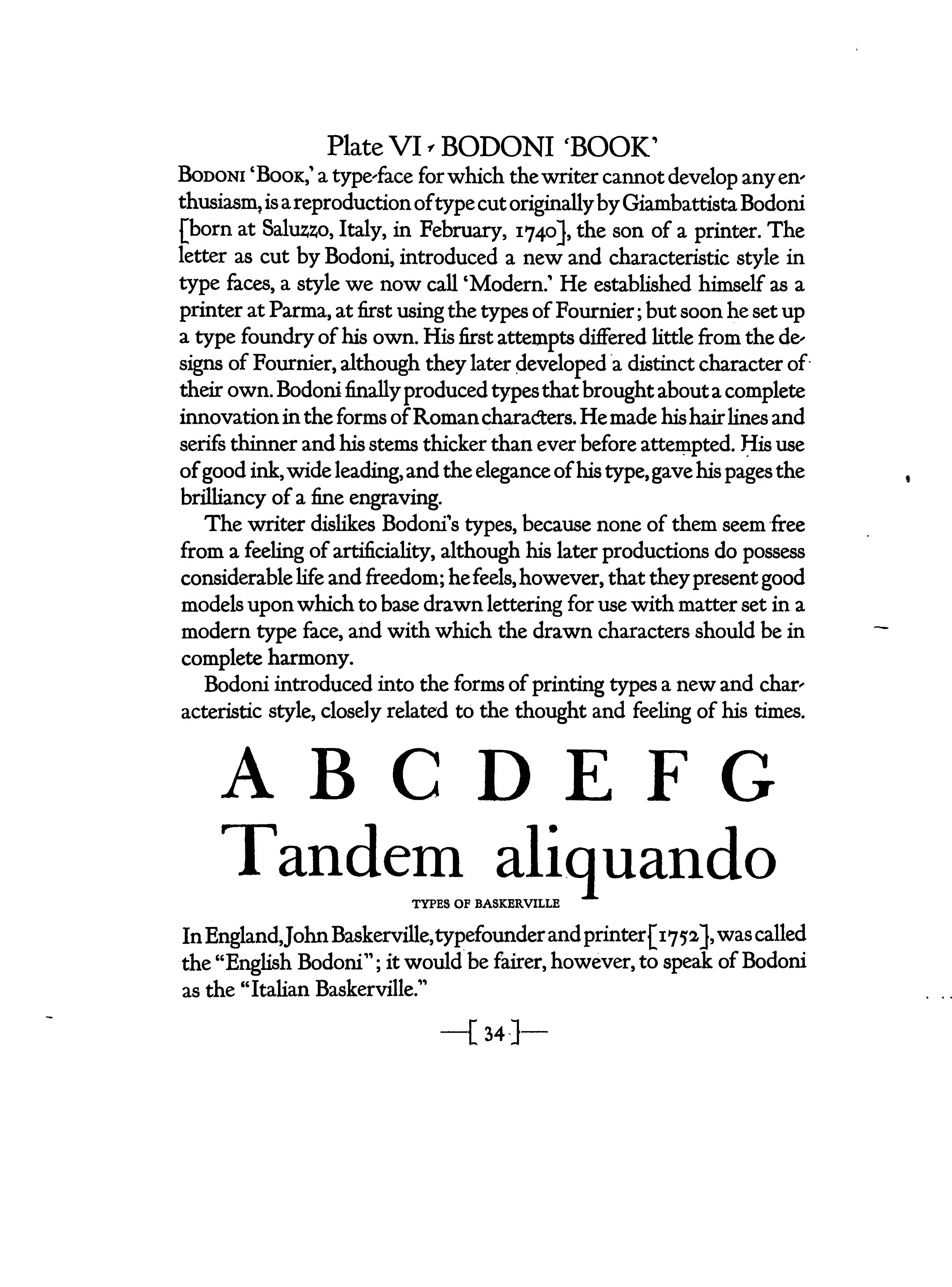
In Elements of Lettering, Goudy comments on the work of Baskerville and Bodoni in a book typeset with his Kennerley Old Style. Kennerley is an example of the revival of 'old style' fonts that began to displace Didone type for much general use around the end of the nineteenth century.

Frederic Goudy, an Arts and Crafts movement-inspired printer turned type designer, had similar reservations about the lettering style. While he mentioned Bodoni in his book Elements of Lettering, he wrote that it was a style "for which the writer cannot develop any enthusiasm", adding: "his pages [had] the brilliance of a fine engraving. The writer dislikes Bodoni's types, because none of them seem free from a feeling of artificiality" As an experiment in this period, Goudy attempted to 'redeem' Didone capitals for titling purposes by leaving a white line in the centre of the thick strokes. He hoped this design, Goudy Open, would leave a lighter colour (density of ink) on the paper.

Nonetheless, Didone designs have remained in use, and the genre is recognised on the VOX-ATypI classification system of typefaces and by the Association Typographique Internationale (AtypI). The genre remains particularly popular for general-purpose use in the printing of Greek (the Didot family were among the first to set up a printing press in the newly independent country). It also is often seen in mathematics, as the open-source standard mathematical typesetting programmes TeX and LaTeX use the Computer Modern family as default. The system's creator, Donald Knuth, deliberately created the system with the intention of producing an effect inspired by the "classic style" of nineteenth-century scientific printing with a family based on an American Monotype Company Modern face.

Many newspapers were founded in the nineteenth century, and many newspaper typefaces have remained rooted in nineteenth-century models of type. Linotype's popular Legibility Group of the 1930s, for many years the model for most newspaper printing worldwide, remained based on this model but toughened-up to increase clarity. American Type Founders' Bodoni typeface, introduced around 1907-1911, became hugely popular for news headlines. Writing in 2017, digital font designer Tobias Frere-Jones wrote that he had kept his font design for The Wall Street Journal based on the nineteenth-century model because it "had to feel like the news."

Among popular faces in modern use, the typeface family Century is inspired by later American Didone designs, although compared to many in the Didone genre it has quite a low level of stroke contrast, suitably for its purpose of high legibility in body text. Typefaces of the period have often been revived since for cold type and digital composition, while modern typefaces along the same lines include Filosofia and the open-source Computer Modern. Some later Didone families have focused on subgenres of the period, such as Surveyor, inspired by labels on maps. Fat face typefaces remained popular for display use in the mid-twentieth century with new designs such as Monotype's Falstaff and Morris Fuller Benton's Ultra Bodoni; Matthew Carter's Elephant is a more recent version.

== Usage ==
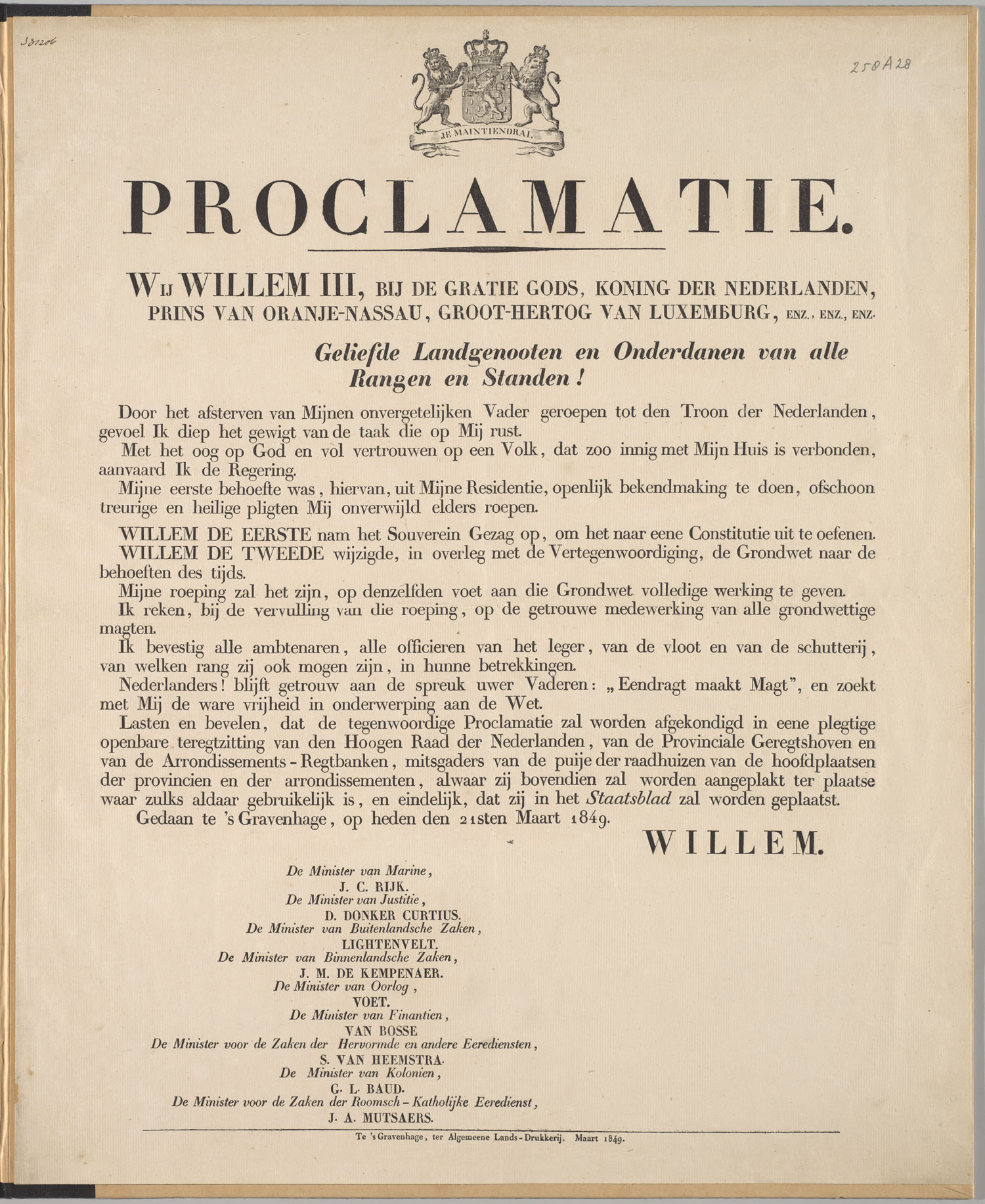
A mixture of regular-weight and bolder Didot-style types (proclamation of William III of the Netherlands, 1849)

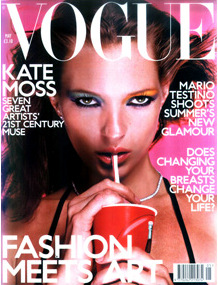
A Didot-style font on the logo of Vogue UK

In print, Didone fonts are often used on high-gloss magazine paper for magazines such as Harper's Bazaar, on which the paper retains the detail of their high contrast well, and for whose image a crisp, 'European' design of type may be considered appropriate. They are used more often for general-purpose body text, such as book printing, in Europe.

The effective use of digital Didone typefaces poses unique challenges. While they can look very elegant due to their regular, rational design and fine strokes, a known effect on readers is 'dazzle', where the thick verticals draw the reader's attention and cause them to struggle to concentrate on the other, much thinner strokes that define which letter is which. For this reason, using the right optical size of digital font has been described as particularly essential with Didone designs. Fonts to be used at text sizes will be sturdier designs with thicker 'thin' strokes and serifs (less stroke contrast) and more space between letters than on display designs, to increase legibility. Optical sizes were a natural requirement of printing technology at the time of Didone typefaces' first creation in metal type, since each size of metal type would be custom-cut, but declined as the pantograph, phototypesetting and digital fonts made printing the same font at any size simpler; a revival has taken place in recent years. French designer Loïc Sander has suggested that the dazzle effect may be particularly common in designs produced in countries where designers are unfamiliar with how to use them effectively and may choose Didone fonts designed for headings. Many modern Didone digital revivals intended for professional printing, such as Parmagiano, ITC Bodoni and Hoefler & Frere-Jones' Didot and Surveyor, have a range of optical sizes, but this is less common on default computer fonts. Among default Didone fonts on computer systems, Century Schoolbook on Windows is oriented towards body text use, while the Didot revival on OS X was specifically intended for display use and not for body text.

== Derivatives ==
As "Didone" serif text faces were the norm throughout the nineteenth century, other fonts of the period and beyond were derived on them. In this picture, a Clarendon display typeface is shown, with the standard nineteenth-century 'R' and 'Q' but bulked-up letterforms and boosted x-height for display printing. (Note: The specific Clarendon face shown is actually the Haas Clarendon of the 1950s, but it is not too dissimilar to ones of the nineteenth century.)

The shape of nineteenth-century Didone designs, with their narrow apertures, has been suggested as a major influence on many early sans-serif fonts such as Akzidenz-Grotesk and its derivatives such as Helvetica, developed in Europe some years after their introduction. An example of this influence is the narrow apertures of these designs, in which strokes on letters such as a and c fold up to become vertical, similar to what is seen on Didone serif fonts.

Matthew Carter's Scotch Roman-inspired computer font Georgia is notable as an extremely distant descendant of Didone typefaces. In Georgia, the stroke contrast is greatly reduced and the bold made much bolder than normal in order for the design to render well on a low-resolution computer monitor, but the general letter shape and ball terminals of Scotch Roman designs are preserved. He also developed the Scotch Roman revival Miller for print use. Given these unusual design decisions, Matthew Butterick, an expert on document design, recommended that organizations using Georgia for onscreen display license Miller to achieve a complementary, more balanced reading experience on paper.

=== Reverse-contrast styles ===
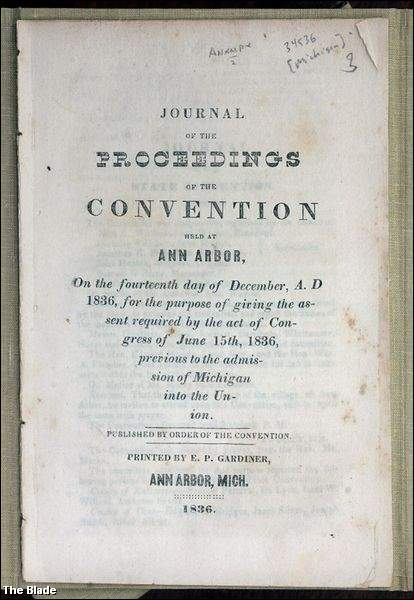
A document printed in 1836, showing Didone (body text), 'Italian' (the word 'proceedings') and early sans-serif fonts

An eccentric method of reworking and parodying Didone typefaces has long been to invert the contrast, making the thin strokes thick and the thick strokes thin. First seen around 1821 in Britain and occasionally revived since, these are often called reverse-contrast fonts. They effectively become slab serif designs because of the serifs becoming thick. In the 19th century, these designs were called Italian because of their exotic appearance, but this name is problematic since the designs have no clear connection with Italy; they do slightly resemble capitalis rustica Roman writing, although this may be a coincidence. They were also called Egyptian, an equally inauthentic term applied to slab serifs of the period.

Intended as attention-grabbing novelty display designs more than as serious choices for body text, within four years of their introduction the printer Thomas Curson Hansard had described them as 'typographic monstrosities'. Nonetheless, somewhat toned-down derivatives of this style persisted in popular use throughout the nineteenth century, and are commonly associated with 'wild west' printing on posters. They ultimately became part of the Clarendon genre of slab-serif typefaces, and these later designs are often called French Clarendon designs.
