= Stroke ending =

In typography (specifically typeface anatomy), a stroke can end in a number of ways. Examples include:

- The serif, including:
  - The regular serif
  - The bracketed serif
  - The half-serif
- The terminal, which is any stroke that does not end in a serif
  - The finial, a tapered or curved end
  - The swash, an extended or decorative flourish that replaces a serif or terminal on a letter
  - The lachrymal (or teardrop), as found in Caslon, Galliard, and Baskerville
  - The ball, as found in Bodoni and Clarendon
  - The beak, a sharp spur, as found in Perpetua, Pontifex, and Ignatius. Also defined as the triangular serifs on the straight lines of capitals like E, F and Z.
  - Hooked
  - Pear-shaped
