= Didot (typeface) =

Serif typeface

- Category: Serif
- Shown here: Linotype Didot by Adrian Frutiger

Didot is a group of typefaces named after the French Didot family of printers, punch-cutters, and publishers. They are classified as Modern or Didone.

The most famous Didot typefaces were developed in 1784–1811. Firmin Didot (1764–1836) cut the letters and cast them as type in Paris. His brother, Pierre Didot (1760–1853), used the types in printing. His edition of La Henriade by Voltaire in 1818 is considered his masterwork. The typeface takes inspiration from John Baskerville's experimentation with increasing stroke contrast and a more condensed armature. The Didot family's development of a high contrast typeface with an increased stress is contemporary to similar faces developed by Giambattista Bodoni in Italy, though Didot’s slightly earlier development surpassed Bodoni as the first Modern typeface in history.

Didot is described as neoclassical and evocative of the Age of Enlightenment. As the movement grew during the 18th century of France, Didot became a signature typeface in the region due to its calculated construction and thin, shaven appearance appealing to the refined tastes of the neoclassical community. The Didot family were among the first to set up a printing press in the newly independent Greece; typefaces in the style of Didot have remained popular in Greek since.

== Revivals and digitisations ==
Several revivals of the Didot faces have been made, first for hot metal typesetting and then for phototypesetting and digital versions.

Among the most successful contemporary adaptations are the ones drawn by Adrian Frutiger for the Linotype foundry, and by Jonathan Hoefler for H&FJ. Hoefler's design anticipates the degradation of hairline in smaller point sizes by employing heavier weighted strokes in the smaller point sizes. Frutiger's Didot revival, which is bundled with macOS, was specifically intended for display use and not for body text, and adds in addition an even more delicate headline font. Additionally, a libre open source implementation of Didot including the Cyrillic and Greek alphabet was released under the name Theano Didot by the Russian historian Alexey Kryukov.

Digital use of Didot poses challenges. While it can look very elegant due to the regular, rational design and fine strokes, a known effect on readers is 'dazzle', where the thick verticals draw the reader's attention and cause them to struggle to concentrate on the other, much thinner strokes that define which letter is which. For this reason, using a font adapted to the intended text size — optical sizing — has been described as particularly essential with Didone designs. Fonts to be used at text sizes will be sturdier designs with thicker 'thin' strokes and serifs (less stroke contrast) and more space between letters than on display designs, to increase legibility. (Optical sizes were a natural requirement of printing technology in the time of metal type, since each size of metal type would be custom-cut, but declined as digital fonts made printing the same font at any size possible. A revival has taken place in recent years but they are normally only offered in commercial fonts.)

== Usage ==
Alexey Brodovitch implemented the usage of Didot in Cahiers d'Art and Harper's Bazaar. Though Vogue had used Didot for their magazine covers multiple times starting from the 1940s, the typeface became permanent in 1955.

The "CBS Didot" version of Didot was commissioned and used by broadcast network CBS for many years, alongside its famous "eye" logo. Its usage had declined in contemporary times; by 2020, its on-air use was largely limited to CBS News, CBS Television Distribution, and its late-night talk show The Late Show with Stephen Colbert. CBS began migrating to TT Norms as its corporate font across all divisions in 2020, although it was reintroduced to the logo of the CBS Evening News in 2026 following the arrival of Tony Dokoupil as new anchor.

In 2019, the Spanish fast fashion company Zara introduced a new logo using a heavily-kerned Didot.

== Gallery ==
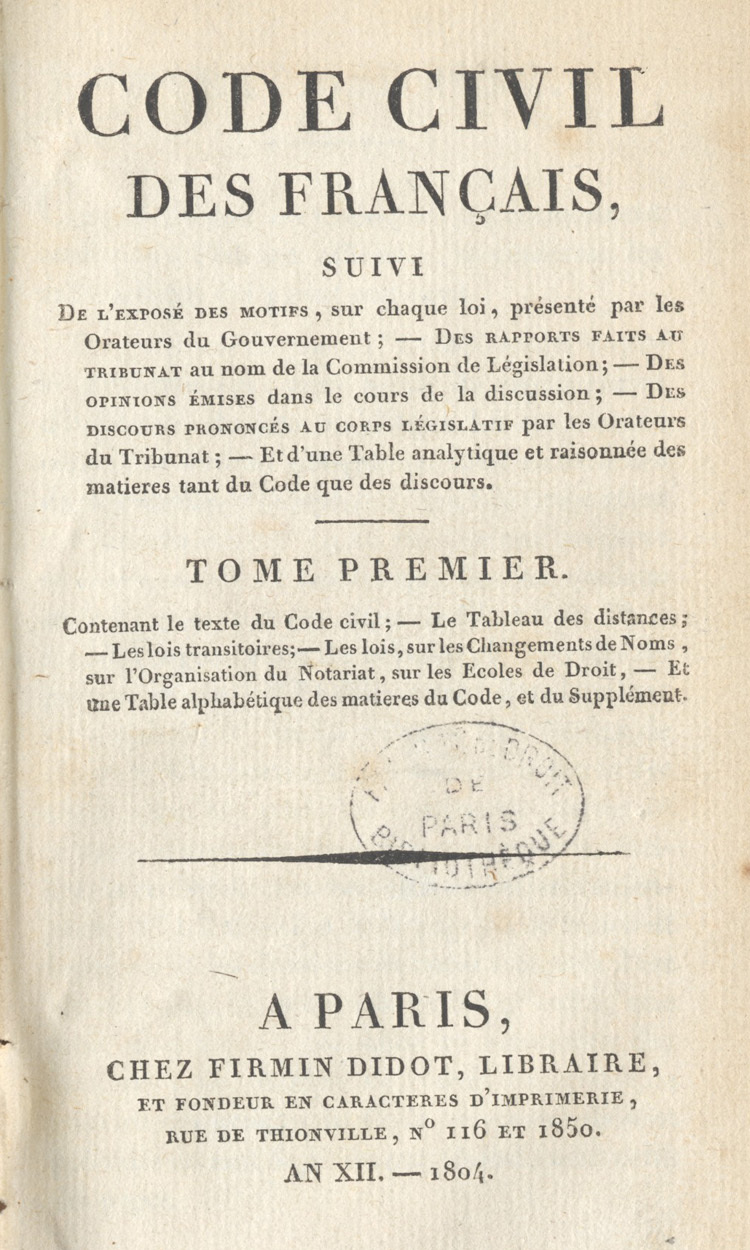
Didot's type in the Code civil des Français, printed by the company of Firmin Didot in 1804.

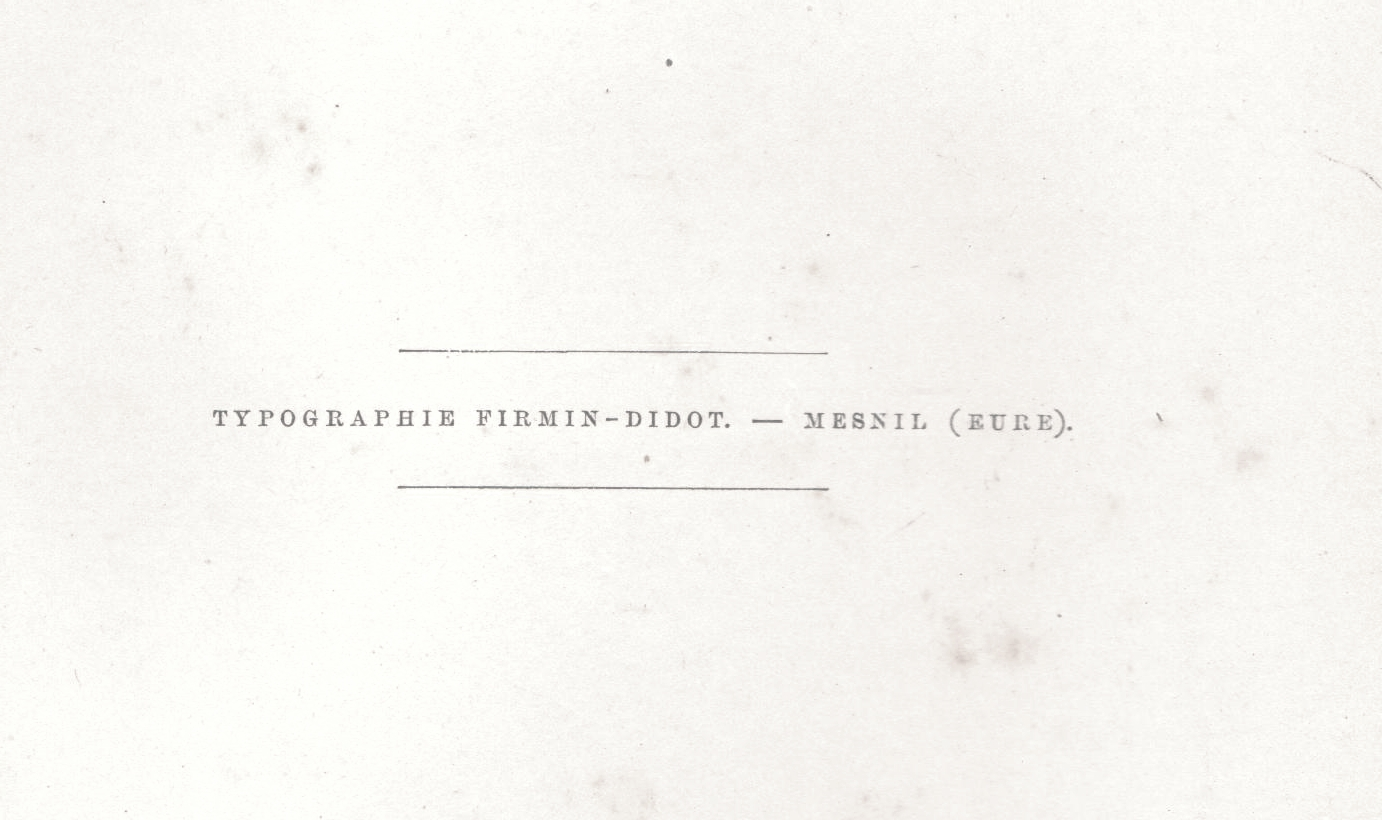
Didot typeface from Histoire d'un trop bon chien by Gaspard de Cherville, 1867. In the last "N" the fine line of the vertical has completely disappeared due to the fine print.

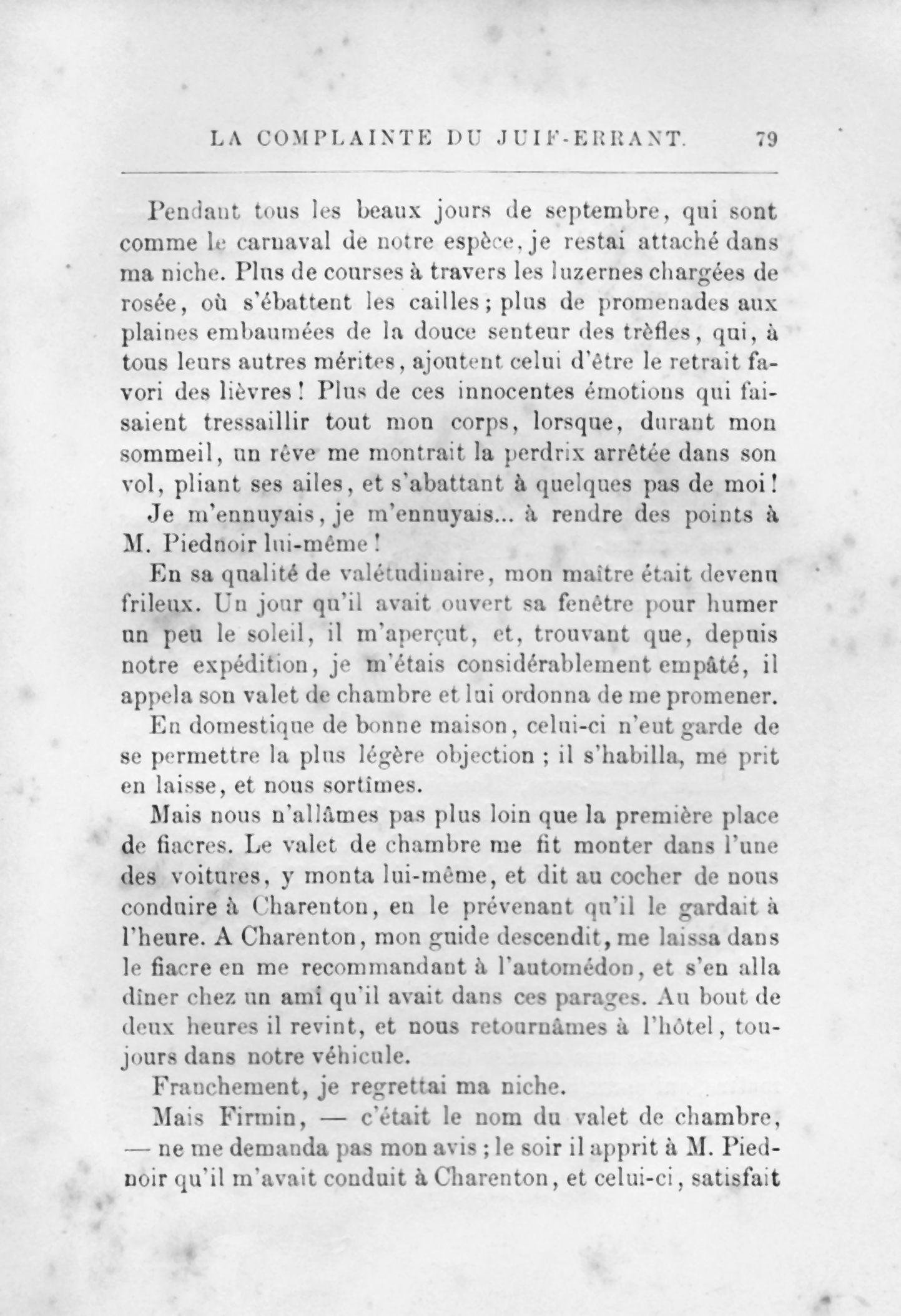
An example of Firmin-Didot-style body text from the same book.

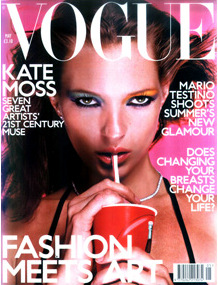
Vogue’s usage of the Didot logo on the May 2000 UK edition magazine.

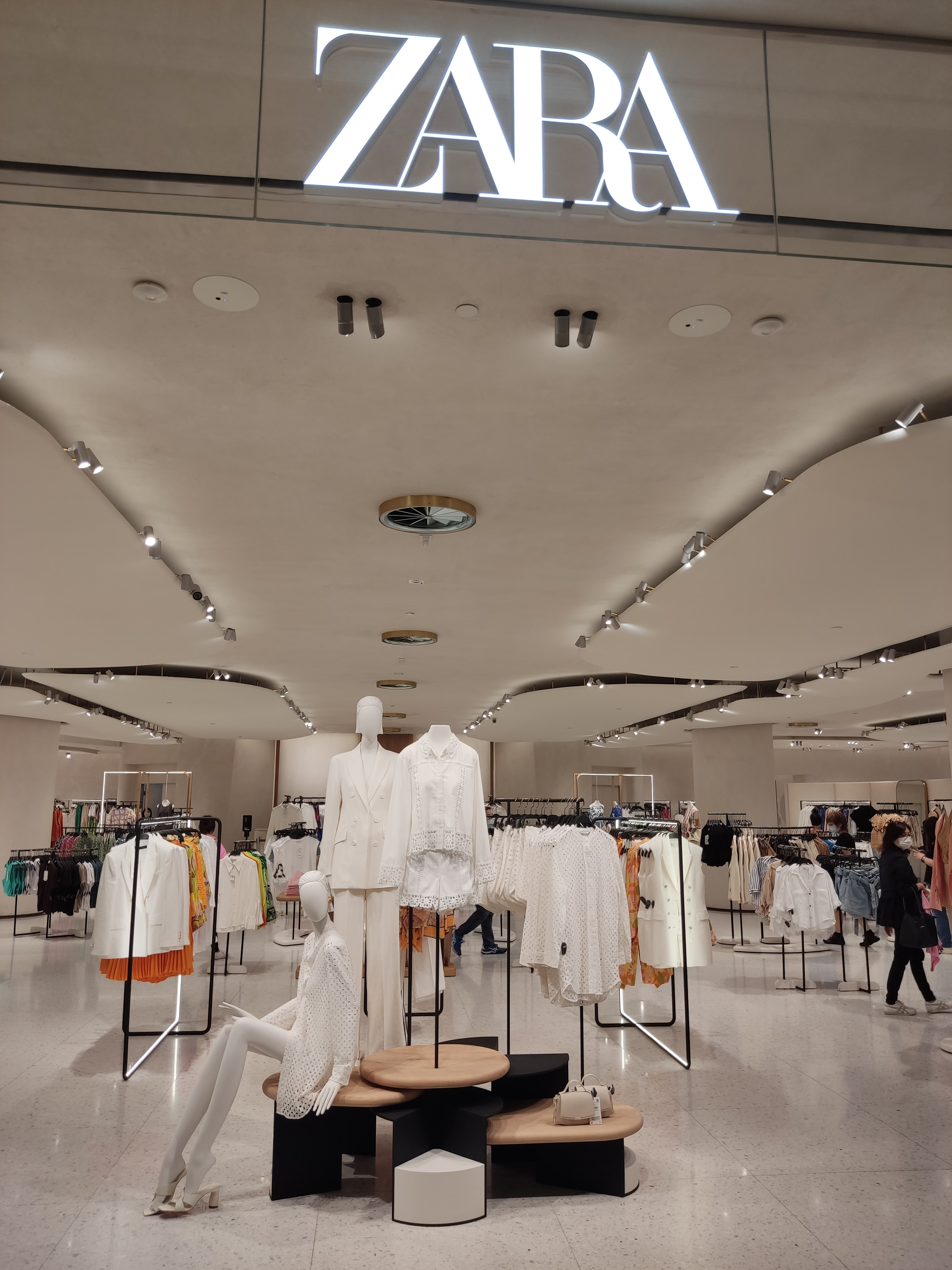
Zara’s tightly kerned Didot logo on a storefront within IFC Mall (Central, Hong Kong).

Multicolor usage of Didot as the logo for The Late Show With Stephen Colbert.

CBS's reintroduction of Didot for CBS Evening News with Tony Dokoupil.
