= Baskerville =

Transitional serif typeface

- Category: Serif
- Classification: Transitional
- Designer: John Baskerville
- Foundry: Deberny & Peignot; Linotype
- Date released: 1757
- Re-issuing foundries: Mergenthaler Linotype; Lanston Monotype; Adobe; American Type Founders; H. Berthold AG
- Shown here: Baskerville Ten by František Štorm

Baskerville is a serif typeface designed in 1757 by John Baskerville in Birmingham, England, and cut into metal by punchcutter John Handy. Baskerville is classified as a transitional typeface, intended as a refinement of what are now called old-style typefaces of the period, especially those of Baskerville's most eminent contemporary, William Caslon. (Note: It should be realised that "Transitional" is a somewhat nebulous classification, almost always including Baskerville and other typefaces around this period but also sometimes some of the later "old-style" faces such as the work of Caslon and his imitators. In addition, of course Baskerville and others of this period would not have seen their work as "transitional" but as an end in itself. Eliason (2015) provides a leading modern critique and assessment of the classification, but even in 1930 Alfred F. Johnson called the term "vague and unsatisfactory".)

Compared to earlier designs popular in Britain, Baskerville increased the contrast between thick and thin strokes, making the serifs sharper and more tapered, and shifted the axis of rounded letters to a more vertical position. The curved strokes are more circular in shape, and the characters became more regular. These changes created a greater consistency in size and form, influenced by the calligraphy Baskerville had learned and taught as a young man. Baskerville's typefaces remain very popular in book design and there are many modern revivals, which often add features such as bold type which did not exist in Baskerville's time.

As Baskerville's typefaces were proprietary to him (Note: With a few exceptions - some Birmingham publishers local to him used some of his types occasionally, including his foreman Robert Martin.) and sold to a French publisher after his death, some designs influenced by him were made by British punchcutters. The Fry Foundry of Bristol created a version, probably cut by their typefounder Isaac Moore. Marketed in the twentieth century as "Fry's Baskerville" or "Baskerville Old Face", a digitisation based on the more delicate larger sizes is included with some Microsoft software. (Note: The attribution to more is generally quite confidently accepted by scholars and the Baskerville imitation typefaces appear on a specimen issued credited to him personally although some writers only describe the attribution as probable. They were later claimed to be "cut for John Baskerville in 1768" by its owners Stephenson Blake; modern historians have generally treated this as a misunderstanding or exaggeration.)

== History ==
The Folio Bible printed by Baskerville in 1763.

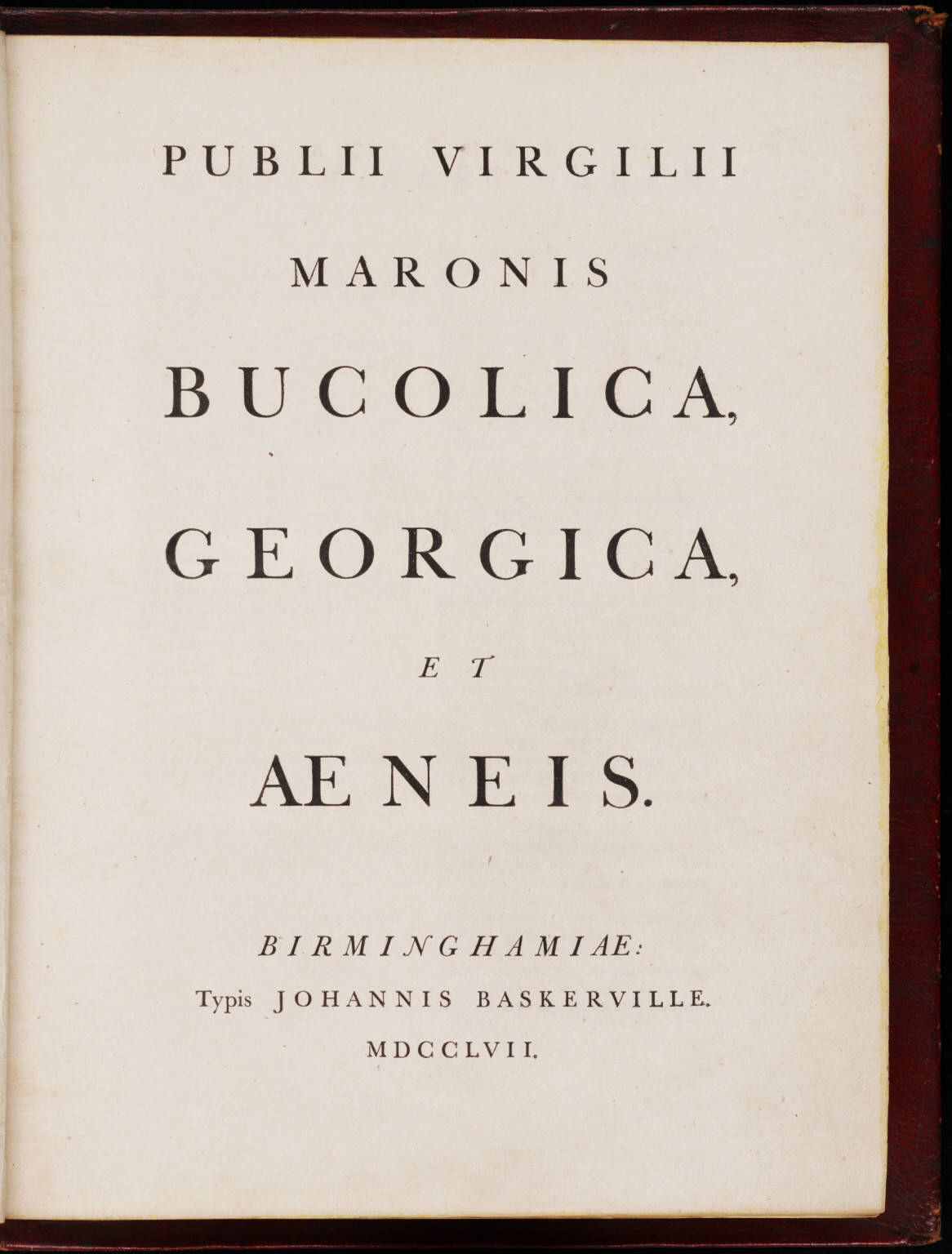
Baskerville's first publication, an edition of Virgil. The design shows the smooth, gleaming finish of his paper and minimal title pages.

Baskerville's typeface was part of an ambitious project to create books of the greatest possible quality. Baskerville was a wealthy industrialist, who had started his career as a writing-master (teacher of calligraphy) and carver of gravestones, before making a fortune as a manufacturer of varnished lacquer goods. At a time when books in England were generally printed to a low standard, using typefaces of conservative design, Baskerville sought to offer books created to higher-quality methods of printing than any before, using carefully made, level presses, a high quality of ink and very smooth paper pressed after printing to a glazed, gleaming finish.

Having been an early admirer of the beauty of Letters, I became insensibly desirous of contributing to the perfection of them. I formed to myself ideas of greater accuracy than had yet appeared, and had endeavoured to produce a Set of Types according to what I conceived to be their true proportion...It is not my desire to print many books, but such only as are books of Consequence, of intrinsic merit or established Reputation, and which the public may be pleased to see in an elegant dress, and to purchase at such a price as will repay the extraordinary care and expense that must necessarily be bestowed upon them.

— Baskerville's preface to Milton

While Baskerville's types in some aspects recall those of William Caslon, the most eminent punchcutter of the time, his approach was far more radical. Beatrice Warde, John Dreyfus and others have written that aspects of his design recalled his handwriting and common elements of the calligraphy taught by the time of Baskerville's youth, which had been used in copperplate engraving but had not previously been cut into type in Britain. (Note: 'Transitional' faces moving on from the sixteenth-century model had appeared and become popular on the continent, for instance the Romain du Roi typeface, the work of Joan Michaël Fleischman and Fournier, but these had not become popular in Britain.) Such details included many of the intricate details of his italic, such as the flourishes on the capital N and entering stroke at top left of the italic 'p'. He had clearly considered the topic of ideal letterforms for many years, since a slate carved in his early career offering his services cutting tombstones, believed to date from around 1730, is partly cut in lettering very similar to his typefaces of the 1750s. (Note: The slate survives in the collection of the Library of Birmingham. Unfortunately, none of his gravestones or formal calligraphy are known to survive.) The result was a typeface cut by Handy to Baskerville's specifications that reflected Baskerville's ideals of perfection. According to Baskerville, he developed his printing projects for seven years, releasing a prospectus advertisement for the project in 1754, before finally releasing his first book, an edition of Virgil, in 1757, which was followed by other classics. At the start of his edition of Paradise Lost, he wrote a preface explaining his ambitions.

A slate carved by John Baskerville in his early career offering his services carving tombstones, in blackletter, roman, script and italic. The design is similar to his typography. A recreation in Monotype Baskerville shows the similarities of letterforms.

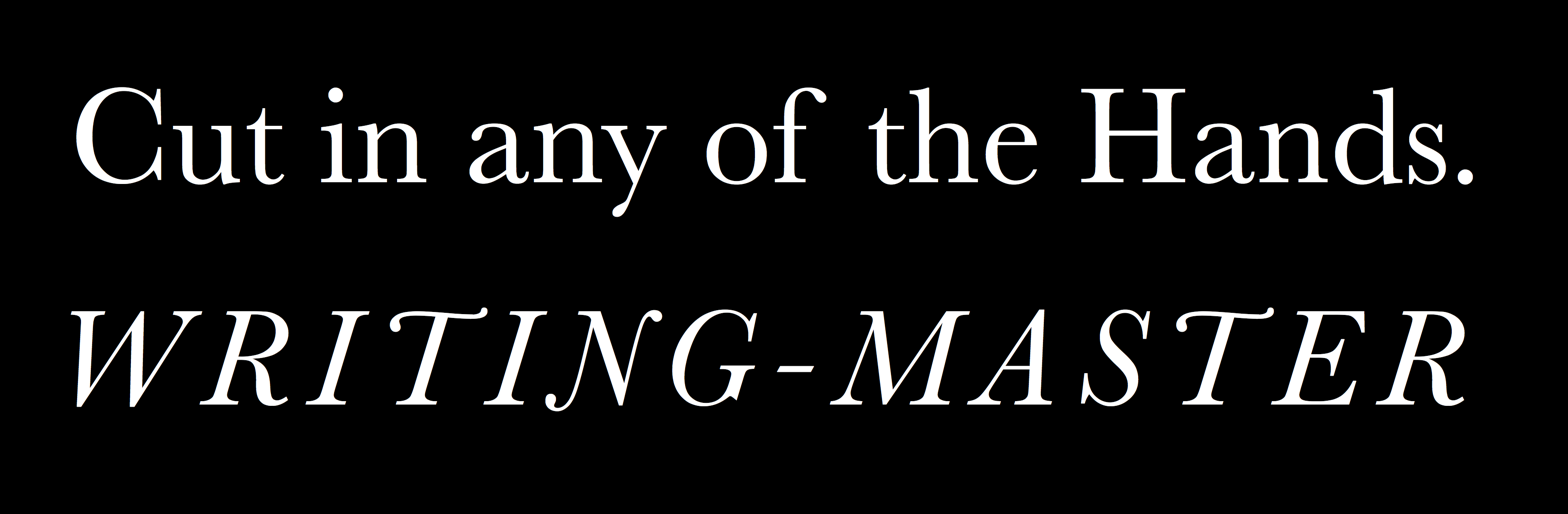

In 1758, he was appointed University Printer to the Cambridge University Press. It was there in 1763 that he published his master work, a folio Bible.

=== Reception ===
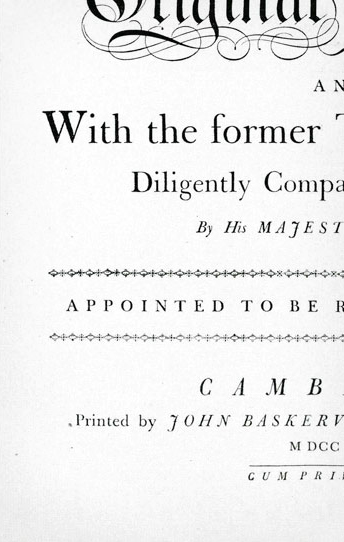
A detail view of Baskerville's Bible for Cambridge, showing the crispness of the impression.

The crispness of Baskerville's work seems to have unsettled (or perhaps provoked jealousy in) his contemporaries, and some claimed the stark contrasts in his printing damaged the eyes. Baskerville was never particularly successful as a printer, being a printer of specialist and elite editions, something not helped by the erratic standard of editing in his books. Abroad, however, he was much admired (if not directly imitated, at least not his style of type design), notably by Pierre Simon Fournier, Giambattista Bodoni and Benjamin Franklin (who had started his career as a printer), who wrote him a letter praising his work. (Note: Mosley also notes that it is not certain, that Bodoni actually planned to come to England with the specific goal of meeting Baskerville, as has sometimes been reported.) His work was later admired in England by Thomas Frognall Dibdin, who wrote that "in his Italic letter...he stands unrivalled; such elegance, freedom and perfect symmetry being in vain to be looked for among the specimens of Aldus and Colinaeus...Baskerville was a truly original artist, he struck out a new method of printing in this country and may be considered as the founder of that luxuriant style of typography which at present so generally prevails; and which seems to have attained perfection in the neatness of Whittingham, the elegance of Bulmer and the splendour of Bensley." Thomas Curson Hansard in 1825 seems to have had misgivings about his work, praising his achievement in some ways but also suggesting that he was a better printer than a type designer. On his death his widow Sarah eventually sold his material to a Paris literary society connected to Beaumarchais, placing them out of reach of British printing. A. F. Johnson however cautions that some perhaps over-patriotic British writers on type design have over-estimated Baskerville's influence on continental type design: "there seems to be no trace of a Baskerville school outside Great Britain, except of course in the use of actual Baskerville types. Didot proceeded from the "romains du roi" and would have so proceeded if Baskerville had never printed. Even in England, where there was a Baskerville period in typography, the modern face came from the French, and not as a development from Baskerville."

Baskerville's styles of type and printing, although initially unpopular in Britain, proved influential for a brief transitional period in the late eighteenth and early nineteenth century, with printers and type designers such as Joseph Fry, Isaac Moore who may have been Fry's punchcutter, and Wilson of Glasgow. Bulmer, cut by the brother of Baskerville's foremen, was one design inspired by it, as is the Bell type cut by Richard Austin. Austin's biographer Alastair Johnston has described this period as a "glorious but short-lived" period of innovative type design in Britain "of harmonious types that had the larger-on-the-body proportions of the Romain du Roi, with the modelling of Baskerville but more colour and fine serifs". Philip Gaskell particularly highlights as a successful typeface of this period the Wilson foundry of Glasgow's 'startling' English-sized (14 pt) roman of 1760, following soon from Baskerville's first editions of 1757 and cut extremely large for its point size: "Baskerville's influence is obvious, but Wilson has outdone the master in the width, weight and even the size of the face. I think myself that with its large x-height, generous width and clean execution, this elegant fount carries out Baskerville's ideas better than did Baskerville himself." This period saw an increasing influence of Didone printing from the Continent, in particular the types of the Didot family and the editions published by Bodoni. The style then disappeared from view altogether following a full trend towards Didone typefaces, often with a much darker style of impression; Updike suggests that this change mostly happened around 1815–20. The Scotch Roman genre which proved popular in Britain and America is something of an intermediate between Didone typefaces and Baskerville's influence. The succession of more extreme "Didone" typefaces quickly replacing Baskerville's style has led to Baskerville being called "transitional" on the road to the Didone style which dominated printing for a long period, although of course Baskerville would not have considered his design "transitional" but as a successful end in itself.

The original Baskerville type (with some replaced letters) was revived in 1917 by Bruce Rogers, for the Harvard University Press, and also released by G. Peignot et Fils in Paris (France). Modern revivals have added features, such as italics with extra or no swashes and bold weights, that were not present in Baskerville's original work.

Baskerville is used widely in documents issued by the University of Birmingham (UK) and Castleton University (Vermont, USA). A modified version of Baskerville is also prominently used in the Canadian government's corporate identity program—namely, in the 'Canada' wordmark. Another modified version of Baskerville is used by Northeastern University (USA), and the ABRSM.

== Characteristics ==
Fry's Baskerville showing its key features: a nearly vertical axis of thinnest points (a), a high stroke contrast (c) and nearly-horizontal serifs which are sharp points (d). This compares to earlier type designs such as Bembo (below) with a diagonal axis (b), less stroke contrast (d) and serifs at a greater angle to the horizontal (e).

Key features of Baskerville are its E where the bottom arm projects further than the upper, a W with no centre serif, and in the lower-case g where the bottom loop is open. Some fonts cut for Baskerville have an 'R' with a straight leg; in others it is curved. Many characters have obvious ball terminals, in contrast to the more wedge-shaped serifs of earlier fonts. Most distinctive is the italic, in which the J has a centre-bar and many other italic capitals have flourishes, the 'p' has a tail pointing downwards and to the left (similar to the entrance stroke that would be made with a pen) and the w has a clear centre loop and swash on the left. In general, Baskerville's type has been described as 'rounder, more sharply cut' than its predecessors. (Some of these distinctive features are discarded in many revivals, as seen below.) Baskerville's type featured text figures or lower-case numbers, the only form of Arabic numerals in use at the time (Roman numerals would be used to align with the capitals). The capitals are very bold, and (like Caslon's) have been criticised for being unbalanced to the lower-case at large sizes.

Baskerville also produced a font for Greek, which survives at Oxford. It has sometimes been criticised as unidiomatic, and has not been particularly popular. (Note: Linotype's upright Baskerville Greek was not based on it but rather copies the style of his roman type.) He also had cut ornaments, many apparently copied or influenced from those offered by the Enschedé type foundry of Haarlem.

== Metal type versions ==
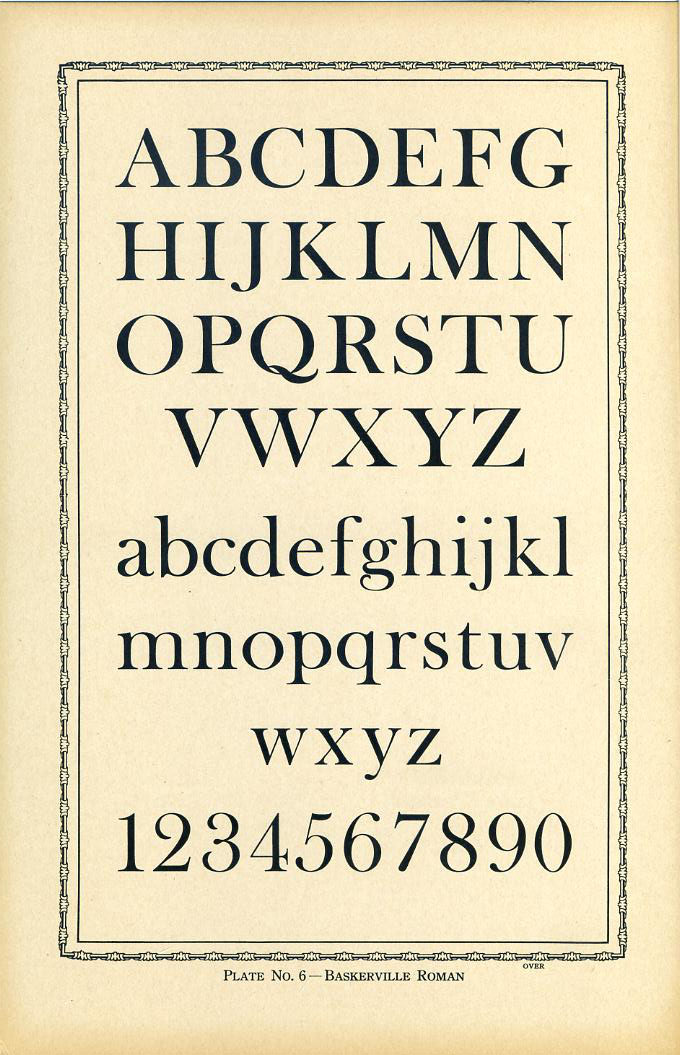
An American adaptation of Isaac Moore's type following Baskerville's style, from the late metal type period. Note the 'Q' and 'a', unlike Baskerville's. The lining figures are not original and the descenders have likely been shortened to fit the American "common line" standard.

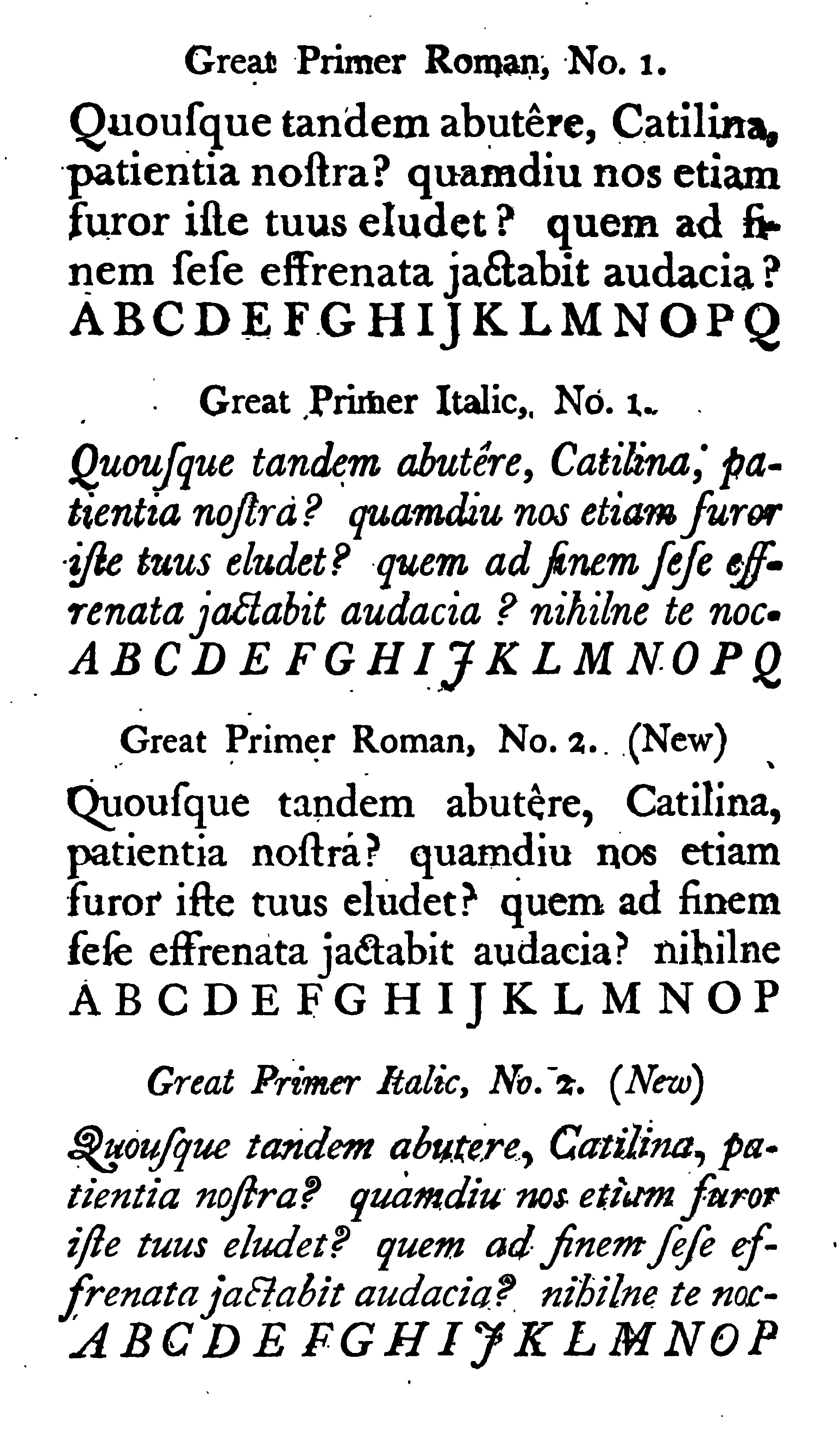
The Fry type foundry's copies of first Baskerville (above) and then Caslon (below), shown in a specimen attached to an edition of The Printer's Grammar, 1787. The image illustrates the limits of Baskerville's type's popularity, since they apparently felt the need to cut a copy of Caslon's type also, although the book is set in Baskerville-style type.

The following foundries offered versions of Baskerville:

- The original punches were sold by Baskerville's widow and eventually ended up in the possession of G. Peignot et Fils by way of Beaumarchais. Charles Peignot donated them to Cambridge University Press in 1953.
- Since Baskerville's equipment was in France and therefore unavailable to them, the Fry type foundry of Bristol produced its own version in the late eighteenth century, presumably cut by typefounder Isaac Moore who also showcased them on his own specimen. (Note: Moore was a Birmingham native, but does not appear to have had any connection with Baskerville himself.) These designs feature a slightly different 'a' at large sizes, which has been followed in many Baskerville revivals. Mosley comments that "In its larger sizes it is one of the most elegant types which have ever been cut, and it is by no means a simple derivative. The curves of the lower-case letters are flatter than Baskerville's and the serifs are slightly more tapered." Fry's version was showcased in a specimen attached to a 1787 reprint of John Smith's (Note: Possibly a pseudonym.) Printer's Grammar, in which it was frankly admitted that "The plan on which they first sat out was an improvement of the Types of the late Mr. Baskerville of Birmingham" but, presumably failing to achieve sufficient popularity, they additionally created copies of Caslon's types.
- When Fry's successors closed, their version was acquired and issued (and some sizes possibly recut) by Stephenson Blake under the name "Baskerville Old Face"; many imitations follow its design, often adding lining figures at cap height and cropping the descenders as was necessary for "standard line" American printing.
- The Fry Foundry version was also copied by American Type Founders. Finding Moore's italic unsatisfactory, they added an italic based on the slightly later Bell typeface cut by Richard Austin.
- The British Monotype Corporation cut a copy of Baskerville in 1923 for its hot metal typesetting system, showcased in Penrose's Annual of 1924; it was extremely popular for printing in Britain during the twentieth century. As with other Monotype revivals, the design is now sometimes called Baskerville MT. It is bundled with OS X in a somewhat slender digitisation.
- Schriftgießerei D. Stempel issued a revival in 1926 under the name "Original-Baskerville".
- Linotype AG, the German arm of Mergenthaler Linotype, adapted the Stempel cutting of the face for linecasting in 1927.
- Linotype's Baskerville was cut in 1923 by George W. Jones, and was re-cut in 1936. A bold version was cut by Chauncey H. Griffith in 1939. It may sometimes be called Baskerville LT.

More loosely, the Scotch Roman genre of transitional types reflects the influence of Baskerville's work, with increasing influence of Didone types from the continent around the beginning of the nineteenth century; the Georgia typeface is influenced by this genre. Due to the cachet of the name, some completely unrelated designs were named 'Baskerville' in the hot metal period.

== Cold type versions ==
Two Baskerville revivals. The top design (Baskerville Old Style in the common Microsoft release) is more suitable for headings and that below (Berthold's) with its thicker strokes for body text. Baskerville Old Style is based on Fry and Moore's recreation, distinguishable by the slightly different curve of its 'a'.

As it had been a standard type for many years, Baskerville was widely available in cold type. Alphatype, Autologic, Berthold, Compugraphic, Dymo, Star/Photon, Harris, Mergenthaler, MGD Graphic Systems, Varityper, Hell AG and Monotype, all sold the face under the name Baskerville, while Graphic Systems Inc. offered the face as Beaumont.

== Digital versions ==
Baskerville revivals take a variety of approaches and the differences are often particularly visible in italic. Monotype's, at top, favours historical accuracy and a quite light colour, retaining the elegant swashed N, Q and T of Baskerville's original. ITC's uses conventional capitals, presumably to offer a more homogenous appearance. Impallari's revival makes the same choice on a thicker structure, more suitable for use at small sizes or onscreen display where there will be no ink spread.

As a somewhat precise design that emphasises contrast between thick and thin strokes, modern designers may prefer different revivals for different text sizes, printing methods and onscreen display, since a design intended to appear elegant in large text sizes could look too spindly for body text. Factors which would be taken into account include compensation for size and ink spread, if any (the extent of which depends on printing methods and type of paper used; it does not occur on screens). Among digitisations, František Štorm's extremely complete range of versions is particularly praised for featuring three optical sizes, the text version having thicker strokes to increase legibility as metal type does. Meanwhile, the common digitisation of Baskerville Old Face bundled with many Microsoft products features dramatic contrasts between thin and thick strokes. This makes it most suited to headings, especially since it does not have an italic.

Another common question facing revivals is what to do with some letters such as 'N' in italics. On faithful revivals such as the Storm digitisation (shown at top right) they have a swash, but this may be thought too distracting for general use or to space poorly in all-caps text. Accordingly, many revivals substitute (or offer as an alternate) capitals without swashes.

Dieter Hofrichter, who assisted Günter Gerhard Lange in designing a Baskerville revival for Berthold around 1980, commented:

We went to Birmingham where we saw original prints by Baskerville. I was quite astounded by how sharp the printing of his specimens is. They are razor-sharp: it almost hurt your eyes to see them. So elegant and high-contrast! He showed in this way what he could achieve. That was Baskerville's ideal - but not necessarily right for today.

Many companies have provided digital releases (some of older Baskerville revivals), including Linotype, URW++, Bitstream and SoftMaker as well as many others. These may have varying features, for example some lacking small caps. Monotype Baskerville is installed on Macs as part of macOS, while many Windows computers receive Moore's adaptation under the name of Baskerville Old Face in the URW digitisation (that described above) without an italic or bold weight.

=== Adaptations ===
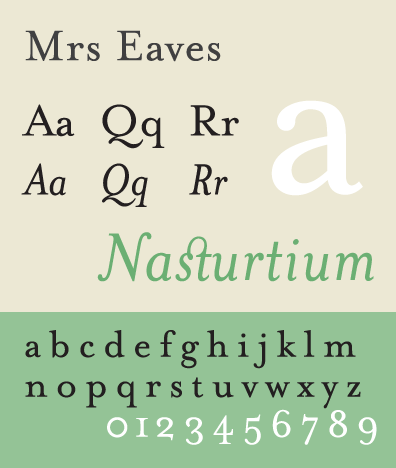
Mrs Eaves, a radical reimagination of the Baskerville style by Zuzana Licko, with a low x-height for display use.

A particularly idiosyncratic Baskerville revival is Mrs Eaves (1996), designed by Zuzana Licko. Named after Baskerville's housekeeper-turned-wife, it uses a low x-height to create a bright page without reducing stroke width. Not intended for extended body text, it is often used on book titles and headings. It uses a variety of ligatures to create effects with linked characters. Licko later created a sans-serif companion, Mr. Eaves.

Big Moore by Matthew Carter is a recent digitisation of the larger sizes of Isaac Moore's early adaptation, often called Baskerville Old Face, with an italic. Harriet is an adaptation by Okaytype inspired by American nineteenth-century printing.

Libre Baskerville is optimised for on-screen reading with a taller x-height, wider counters and lower stroke contrast.

In September 2026, an interdisciplinary research project based at the University of Cambridge and funded by the Arts and Humanities Research Council released an open-source revival font family known as Baskerville Punch. This font is based on John Baskerville's original punches cut between 1750 and 1775, which are held in the Cambridge University Library. The Small Performances project used a range of scientific analyses and artisanal techniques to reconstruct 18th-century punch-cutting and recreate a more true-to-life digital imagining of the Baskerville type.

The 'Canada' wordmark

== Gallery ==
Some examples of volumes published by Baskerville.

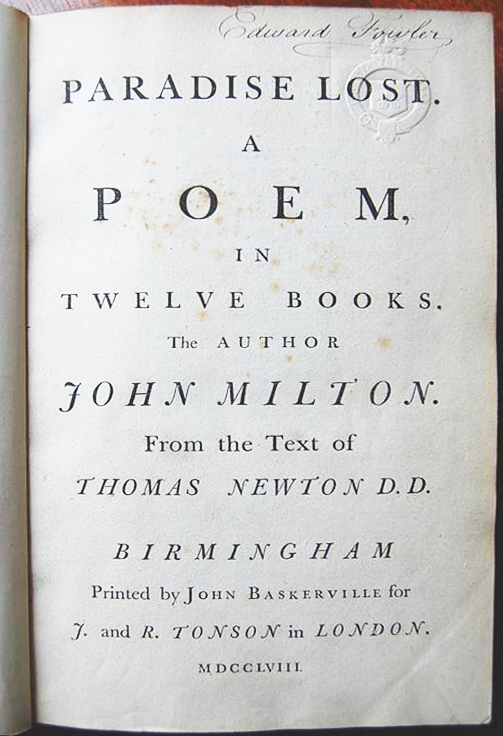
John Milton's Paradise Lost (1758)

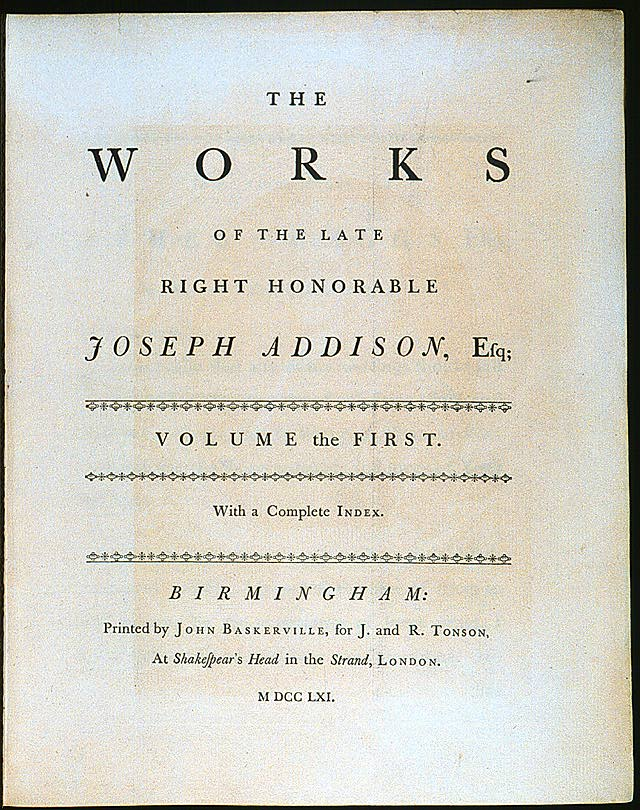
Volume One of The works of Joseph Addison (1761)

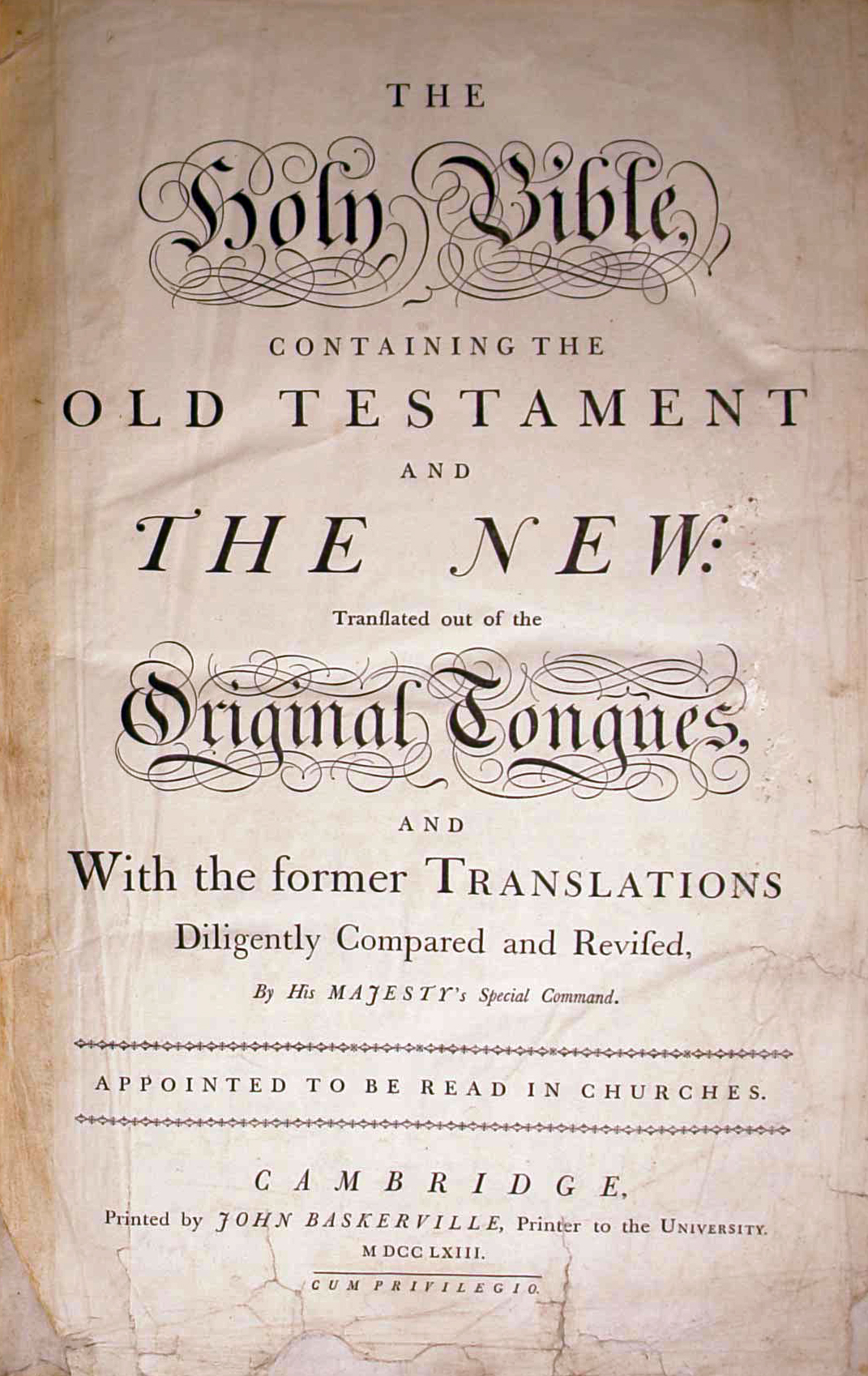
Title page of Baskerville's 1763 Bible (showing additional custom lettering)

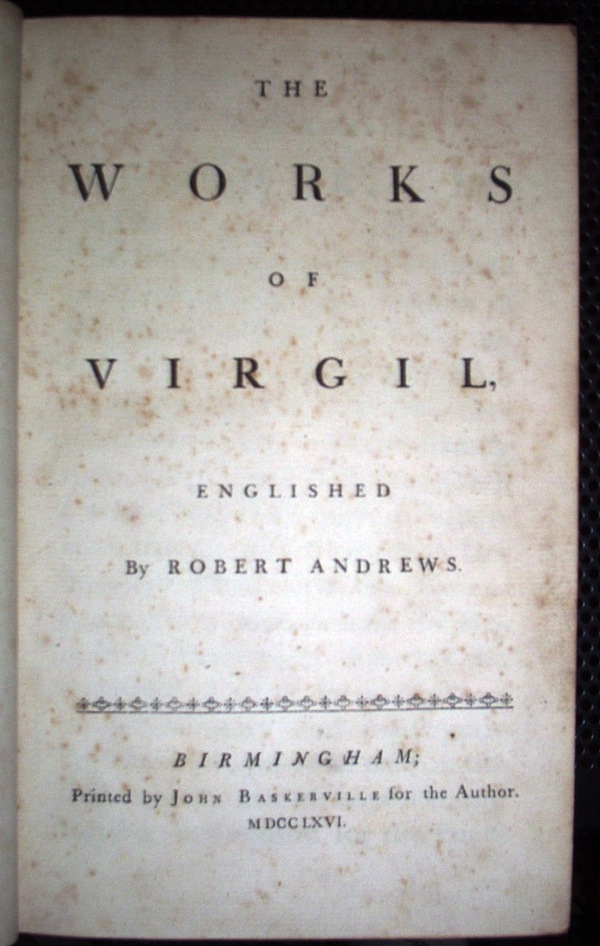
The 1766 translation of Virgil into English, by Robert Andrews

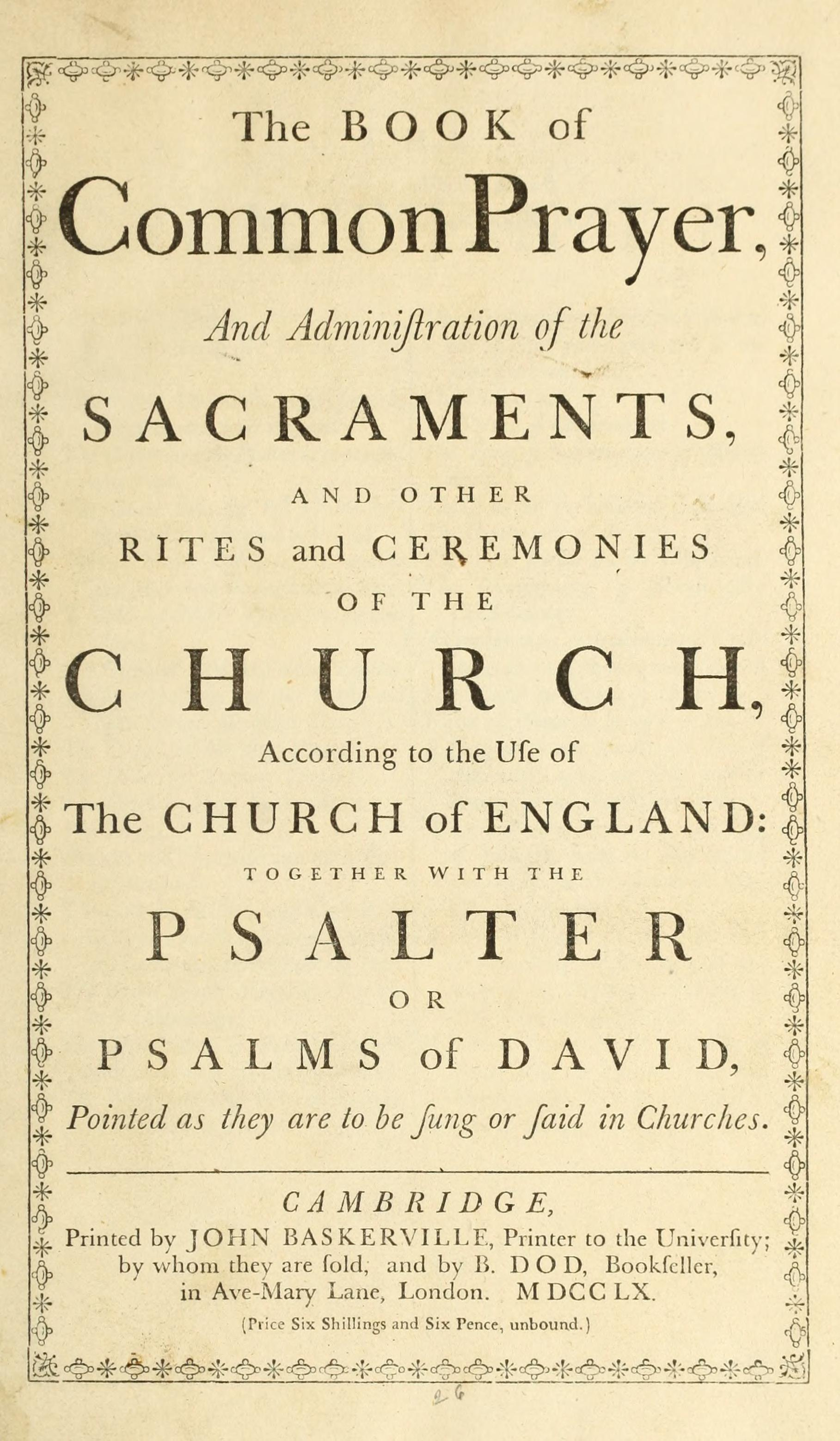
Baskerville's 1760 Book of Common Prayer.

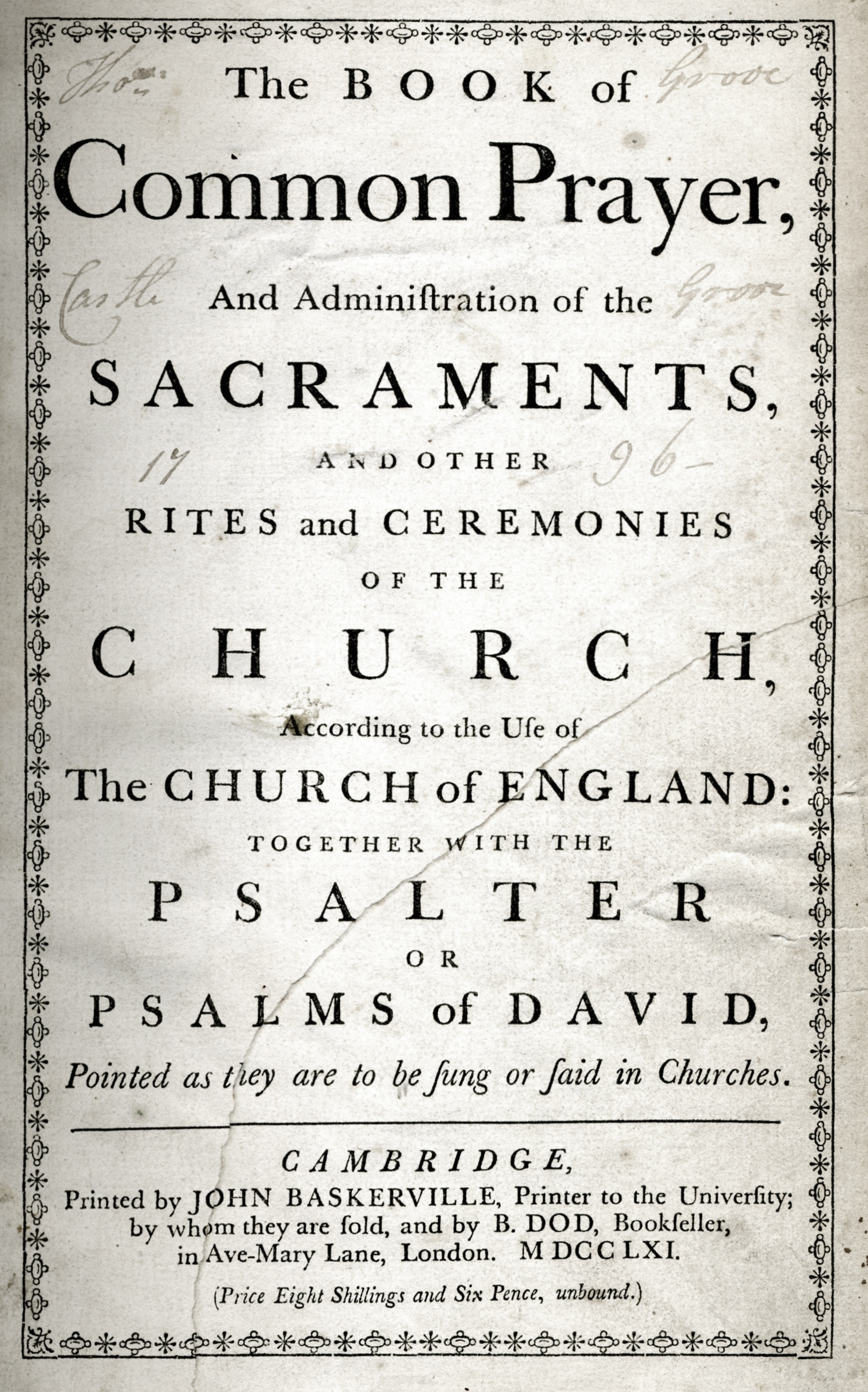
An edition from 1766.
