= William Bulmer (printer) =

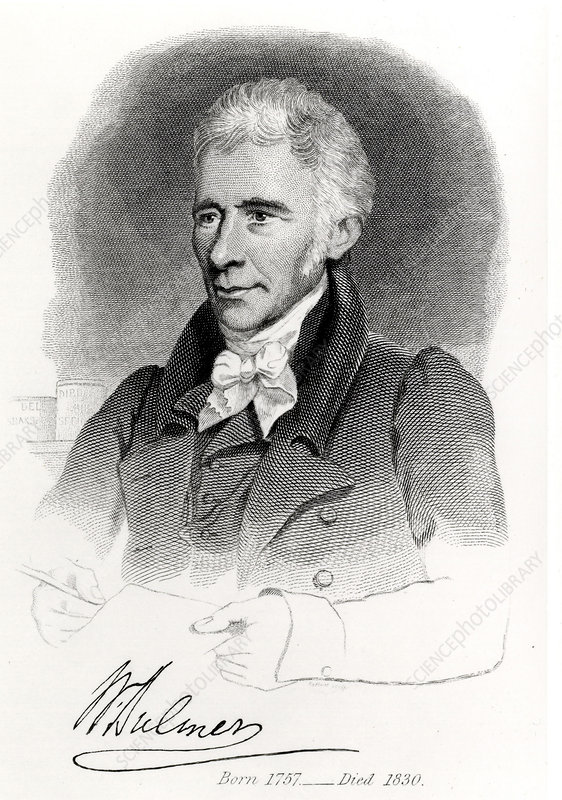
Engraving of William Bulmer

The Bulmer typeface is a modern revival of William Martin's design, commissioned by George Nicol for the Boydell Shakespeare.

William Bulmer (1757–1830) was an English printer and typographer.

== Biography ==
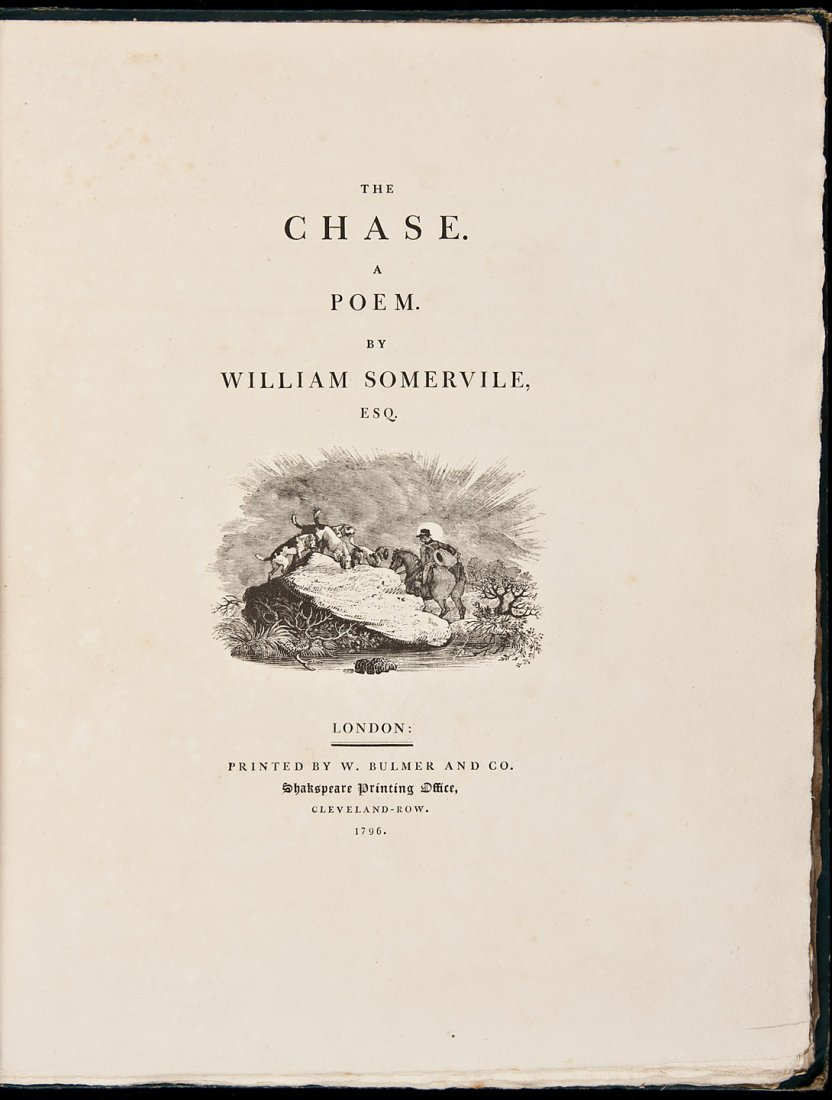
An edition of The Chase by Sommerville; William Bulmer, 1796

William Bulmer was born in 1757 as one of the youngest children of Thomas Bulmer in Newcastle-upon-Tyne. He was apprenticed to the printer Mr. Thompson, at Burnt House Entry, St. Nicholas' Churchyard. During his apprenticeship he formed a friendship with Thomas Bewick, which lasted throughout his life

When William Bulmer first came to London, he worked for the printer and publisher John Bell and was introduced to George Nicol, bookseller to King George III, who, with John Boydell had conceived a lavish edition of the works of Shakespeare with illustrations from the foremost artists of the day. For the project Nicol had already engaged the services of William Martin, a type-founder from Birmingham who had worked for John Baskerville, to design and cut the type.

In the spring of 1790, William Bulmer established The Shakespeare Press at 3 Russell Court, off Cleveland Row, St. James's and the first part of the Shakespeare appeared in January 1791 comprising "Much Ado About Nothing" and "Richard III".

In 1796 Bulmer published a quarto edition of Somerville's "Chase". All the engravings but one in this volume were designed by John Bewick, and engraved by his brother Thomas Bewick. Other books followed, including Thomas Frognall Dibdin's Typographical Antiquities of Great Britain, Bibliographical Decameron, and the Bibliotheca Spenceriana.

Bulmer printed almost 600 books and pamphlets until his retirement 1819 as well as reports and catalogues for many institutional clients such as The East India Company, the Royal Society, the British Museum and the Roxburghe Club.

William Bulmer died at Clapham, on 9 September 1830, and was buried in St. Clement Danes, Strand.

== Selected publications ==
- Persius (1790)
- Milton (3 vols. 1793–1797)
- Shakespeare (9 vols. 1794–1804)
- Museum Worsleyanum by Sir Richard Worsley. 2 vols. (1794 &c.); the date 1794 is on both title-pages, but the book was issued serially in six fascicles; part one issued 1798 (costing £2,887 4s), part one issued 1802.
- Francis Blomefield (1805)
- Matthew Flinders (1814)
