= Richard Austin (punchcutter) =

Richard Austin (1756–1832) was an English punchcutter. He was the original cutter of the typefaces now known as Bell, Scotch Roman, and Porson. Born in London 4 August 1756 and christened at St Luke's Old Street, he studied seal, die and copper-plate engraving as an apprentice to John Phillips near Finsbury Square. He married Phillips' daughter Sarah and set up on his own about 1786. He was hired by John Bell's British Letter Foundry in 1788 as a punch-cutter, to imitate Didot's 1782 types "de la troisième manière," cut by Pierre Vafflard to F-A Didot's designs. Bell sold his interest in the foundry to S & C Stephenson. When the foundry closed in 1797, Austin brought in his own punches and sold strikes to Fry & Steele, Figgins, and Caslon. Strikes were even sold in North America. Austin cut Greek types for Cambridge University Press in 1806–8, following designs provided by the famous master Richard Porson. He probably also cut the Sarcophagus Greek that preceded it. Austin then provided strikes to William Miller's foundry in Edinburgh & Alexander Wilson's Sons' foundry in Glasgow, creating the types now known as Scotch, before founding his own Imperial Letter Foundry in London in 1815, with his son George (who had been his apprentice until 1805). The first Miller Specimen of 1809 is now lost (The University of Vermont holds the 1811 Specimen). Wilson's earliest specimen showing the improved types is dated 1812. Richard Austin died circa 20 August 1832, leaving the foundry to his son George, whom many credited with the innovations in type designs manifest in the Scotch types. Austin's other sons were John Phillips Austin, a music engraver, and Richard Turner Austin (1781-1842), a painter (member of the Royal Academy) and commercial wood engraver.

== Typefaces ==
- Austin's Pica No. 1 (c. 1918) .
- Bell (1790, British Letter Foundry), revived 1931 by Monotype Corporation. Called "Brimmer" by Bruce Rogers at Riverside Press.
- Scotch Roman (1809, William Miller/Miller & Richards), revived 1903 by Linotype, and in 1907 by Monotype Corporation. Also known as Georgian, Scotch Roman #137 is a 1920 revision by Monotype Corporation.
