= Gaspard de Cherville =

Gaspard, marquis de Cherville (1819 Chartres - 1898), was a French author.

== Career ==
For some time he collaborated with the Alexandre Dumas. Subsequently, he became known as a writer on hunting, angling, and animal life.

== Works ==
From the list of his independent works may be cited:

- Les aventures d'un chien-de-chasse (“Adventures of a hunting dog,” 1862; 2d ed. 1882)
- Histoire d'un trop bon chien (“Story of a very good dog,” 1867; an illustrated ed. 1884)
- Les éléphants (“Elephants,” 1895)
