= Bulmer (typeface) =

Typeface

- Category: Serif
- Classification: Transitional
- Designers: William Martin; William Bulmer; Morris Fuller Benton (revival)
- Foundry: American Type Founders; Monotype many others
- Date created: c. 1790

Bulmer is a serif typeface originally designed by punchcutter William Martin around 1790 for the Shakespeare Press, run by William Bulmer (1757–1830). The types were used for printing the Boydell Shakespeare folio edition. The name "Bulmer" was given to the typeface retroactively.

== Design and history ==
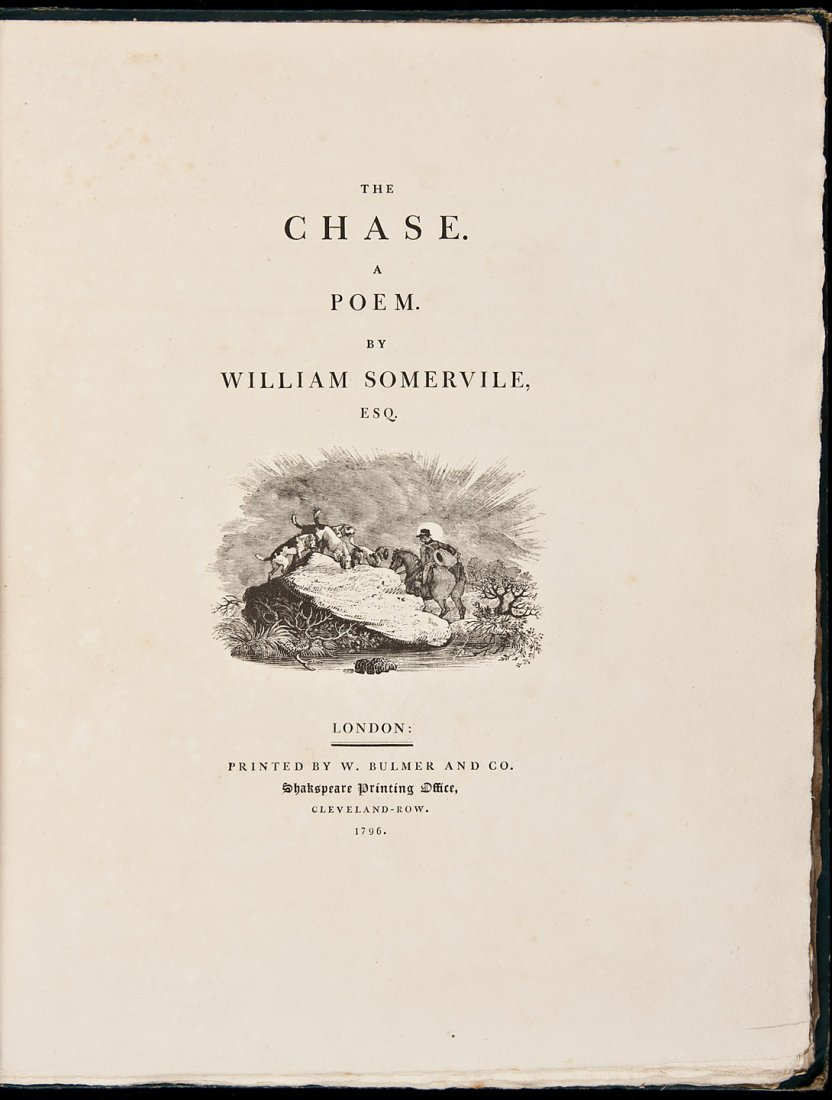
William Somervile's The Chase, printed by William Bulmer in around 1796.

Bulmer is considered to be a late "transitional" face. Faces in this style, which became most common in the mid to late eighteenth century, were more crisply engraved than earlier faces. William Martin's typefaces show strong influence of the Baskerville typeface of John Baskerville which popularised this style in England, but with more contrast, bolder, narrower and with sharper serifs. His brother Robert Martin had worked as Baskerville's foreman and William Martin probably worked for him too. They also show influence of the crisp new "modern" faces, now called Didones, increasingly popular on the continent. The typeface used "modern" figures, a recent innovation, at nearly capital-height. Although Bulmer wrote in his preface to his edition of Poems by Goldsmith and Parnell that Martin would in future be able to offer a specimen of his typefaces, he is not known to have ever issued one. However, they were also used by the Liverpool printer John McCreery and his successor G.F. Harris, who did issue a specimen book in 1807.

The Bulmer typeface fell out of interest due to changing tastes in the early nineteenth century following the death of William Martin in 1815, but returned to interest in the twentieth century, when several revival versions were released. In this period, D. B. Updike described Martin's types as "delicate and spirited" and Stanley Morison described it as "a variation on the Baskerville theme".

Bulmer's distinguishing characters are an uppercase R with a curved tail. Lowercase g has a small bowl and a curved ear; a heavier stroke weight on the lower right side of the bowl contributes to a sense of that character leaning backwards. Lowercase b's lower left corner is essentially symmetric to d. Uppercase italic characters J, K, N, T and Y have flourishes reminiscent of Baskerville's. The resulting face could show off the high quality of printing technology of the time: James Mosley has described Bulmer's editions: "The type was, however, only one ingredient in the ensemble which Bulmer managed to striking success...the good ink, the consistently good presswork and the superb Whatman paper are combined in one of the few really successful English attempts at printing in the grand manner."

== Versions ==
=== Metal type ===
Foundry type versions of Bulmer were made by the following manufacturers:

- American Type Founders (1923-8, Morris Fuller Benton)
- Intertype
- Lanston Monotype
- British Monotype (1937, for an edition of Dickens for the Nonesuch Press printed by R. and R. Clark).

=== Digital versions ===
A contemporary digital revival (shown above right), supervised by Robin Nicholas at Monotype Imaging, is based on the 1928 revival by Morris Fuller Benton. It features text and display optical sizes and oldstyle and lining figures.
