= Ball terminal =

Design feature common in the transitional genre of serif fonts

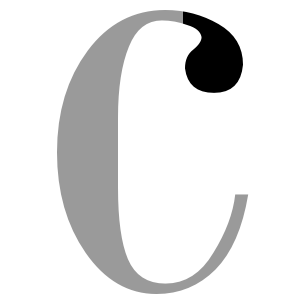
Example of a ball terminal seen in the Bodoni font series

A ball terminal is a design feature of a typeface or glyph where the end of a stroke takes a roughly circular shape, as opposed to a serif or a square end.
