= Erhardt (disambiguation) =

Erhardt or Ehrhardt is a German surname.

Erhardt or Ehrhardt may also refer to:

- Erhardt (given name)
- Ehrhardt (automobile), a German automobile
- Erhardt Island, Nunavut, Canada
- Ehrhardt, South Carolina
- Ehrhardt (typeface), Monotype series 453, typeface; an old-style serif typeface used in many books
- Marinebrigade Ehrhardt, a Freikorps group after World War I

== See also ==
- Erhard
