= Hartl (surname) =

Hartl is a German surname. It was derived from the German word hart ('hard', 'tough'), but for some bearers it may have arisen as a derivation from the given names Hartmann, Erhart, etc. The surname also commonly appears in Czech (feminine: Hartlová). Notable people with the surname include:

- Albert Hartl (1904–1982), German priest and Nazi Party member
- Daniel Hartl (born 1943), American biologist
- Franz-Ulrich Hartl (born 1957), German biochemist
- Hans-Werner Hartl (born 1946), German footballer
- Jan Hartl (born 1952), Czech actor
- Karl Hartl (1899–1978), Austrian film director
- Manuel Hartl (born 1985), Austrian footballer
- Michael Hartl, American physicist and entrepreneur
- Patrik Hartl (born 1976), Czech writer
- Raphael Hartl (born 1975), Austrian rower
- Roswitha Hartl (born 1962), Austrian judoka
- Wolfgang Hartl (born 1941), Austrian sprint canoeist

== See also ==
- Härtl, a surname
- Hertl, a surname
