= Erhardt =

Erhardt or Ehrhardt, from Old High German for "Ehre" = honour and "hard" = strong is a German surname. Notable people with the surname include:

== Ehrhardt ==
- Anke Ehrhardt, researcher on gender, sexual development and HIV
- Annelie Ehrhardt (1950–2024), German athlete
- Arthur Ehrhardt (1896–1971), German Waffen-SS officer and leading figure in the post-war neo-Nazi movement
- Clyde Ehrhardt (1921–1963), American football offensive lineman
- Johann Heinrich Ehrhardt (1805-1883), German locomotive manufacturer and inventor
- Heinrich Ehrhardt (1840-1928), German industrialist, nephew of Johann Heinrich
- Hermann Ehrhardt (1881–1971), German Freikorps commander
- Karl Ehrhardt (1924–2008), iconic New York Mets fan
- Paul Ehrhardt (1888-1981), German painter
- Rube Ehrhardt (1894–1980), American baseball pitcher
- Tom Ehrhardt, American football player

== Erhardt ==
- Carl Erhardt (1897–1988), English ice hockey player
- Christopher Erhardt (1958–2012), American video gamer producer
- Erika von Erhardt-Siebold (1890–1964), American literary scholar
- Friedman Paul Erhardt (1943–2007), German-American television chef known as Chef Tell
- Heinz Erhardt (1909–1979), German comedian and actor
- Herbert Erhardt (1930–2010), German football player
- Jakob Erhardt
- Joel Erhardt (1838–1909), American police commissioner of New York City
- Ron Erhardt (politician) (born 1929), American politician from Minnesota
- Ron Erhardt (1931–2012), American football player
- Tom Erhardt (1928–2019), American-born British theatrical literary agent
- Trevor Erhardt (born 1962), Canadian ice hockey player

== Fictional characters ==
- Doctor Laurence Erhardt, character on the television series Mystery Science Theater 3000

== See also ==
- Erhard (disambiguation)
- Erhart
