= Ehrhardt (typeface) =

Font

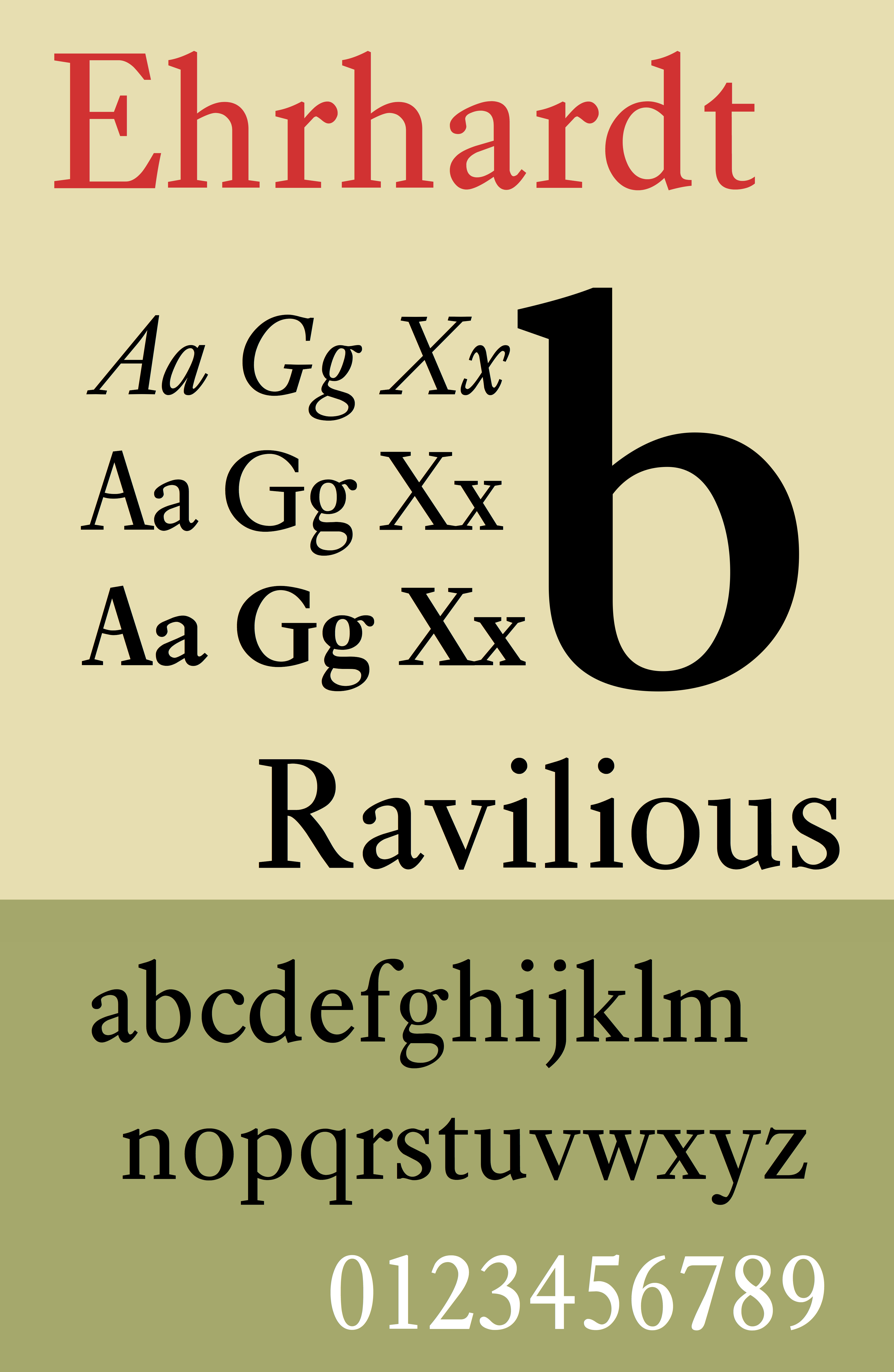
- Category: Serif
- Classification: Old-style; Dutch
- Designer: Nicholas Kis
- Foundry: Monotype Corporation
- Date released: 1938, 1680s
- Design based on: Janson
- Variations: Fleet Titling

Ehrhardt is an old-style serif typeface released by the British branch of the Monotype Corporation in 1938. Ehrhardt is a modern adaptation of printing types of "stout Dutch character" from the Dutch Baroque tradition sold by the Ehrhardt foundry in Leipzig. These were cut by the Hungarian-Transylvanian pastor and punchcutter Miklós (Nicholas) Tótfalusi Kis while in Amsterdam in the period from 1680 to 1689.

From 1937 to 1938, Monotype re-cut the type for modern-day usage, and it has become a popular book typeface. Ehrhardt has a slightly condensed design, giving it a strongly vertical, crisp appearance.

== Historical background ==
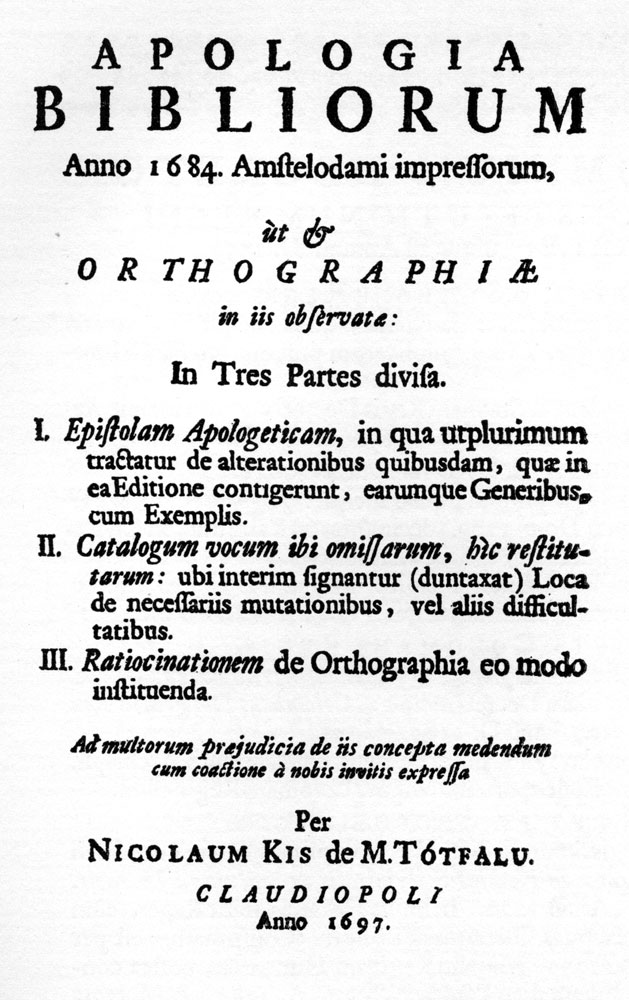
A book printed by Kis in Claudiopolis (modern name Cluj-Napoca) in 1697, after his return to Transylvania. It defends his somewhat contentious choices of editing and orthography in his Hungarian printing.

Miklós Kis, a Transylvanian Protestant pastor and schoolteacher, became deeply interested in printing after being sent to Amsterdam to help print a Hungarian Protestant translation of the Bible. This was a period of considerable prosperity for the Netherlands and a time when its styles of printing were very influential across Europe, making it a centre for the creation of new typefaces. He developed a second career as a punchcutter, an engraver of the punches used as a master for making moulds for metal type, working on commission for printers and governments. Kis returned to Transylvania around 1689 and may have left matrices (the moulds used to cast type) in Leipzig on his way home. (Note: This is a slight simplification: technically the mould is the term used for the frame around which a sort is cut. However, the matrix is the mould for the variable part of a sort.) The Ehrhardt type foundry of Leipzig released a surviving specimen sheet of them around 1720.

Kis's typefaces were in the tradition of Dutch and German printing developed over the previous century that would later be called the "Dutch taste" (goût hollandois), a term originating from the writings of Pierre Simon Fournier in the next century. This developed the influence of French typefounding such as the typefaces engraved by Claude Garamond with a smooth, even structure and 'e' with a level cross-stroke, by increasing the stroke width, boosting the x-height (height of lower-case letters) and reducing the length of the descenders to achieve a noticeably darker colour on the page.

Kis's surviving matrices were first acquired by Stempel, and are now held in the collection of the Druckmuseum (Museum of Printing), Darmstadt. They were earlier often called the Janson designs, after the Dutch printer Anton Janson, based in Leipzig, who it was once believed might have created them, and Linotype's revival of the same designs in a less condensed form accordingly is named Janson. Kis's identity as the maker of the typefaces was rediscovered by comparison with type from Hungarian archive sources (including an autobiography) on which his name was identified.

== Modern history ==
Monotype's development of Ehrhardt took place under the influence of executive and historian of printing Stanley Morison, not long after their successful creation of Times New Roman. It began from a recognition that the Janson designs were well-respected by fine printers of the Arts and Crafts period such as Daniel Berkeley Updike, who could print books from them using hand-set type cast from surviving original matrices owned by the Stempel company of Germany. Morison had discussed what he knew of their history with Updike in their extensive correspondence from the 1920s onwards. Modernised versions of the Janson designs for hot metal printing were being created by Linotype and Monotype's American branch at the same time. In addition, Morison was interested in the history of printing in Leipzig, a centre of the German book trade, and would later write an article on the topic.

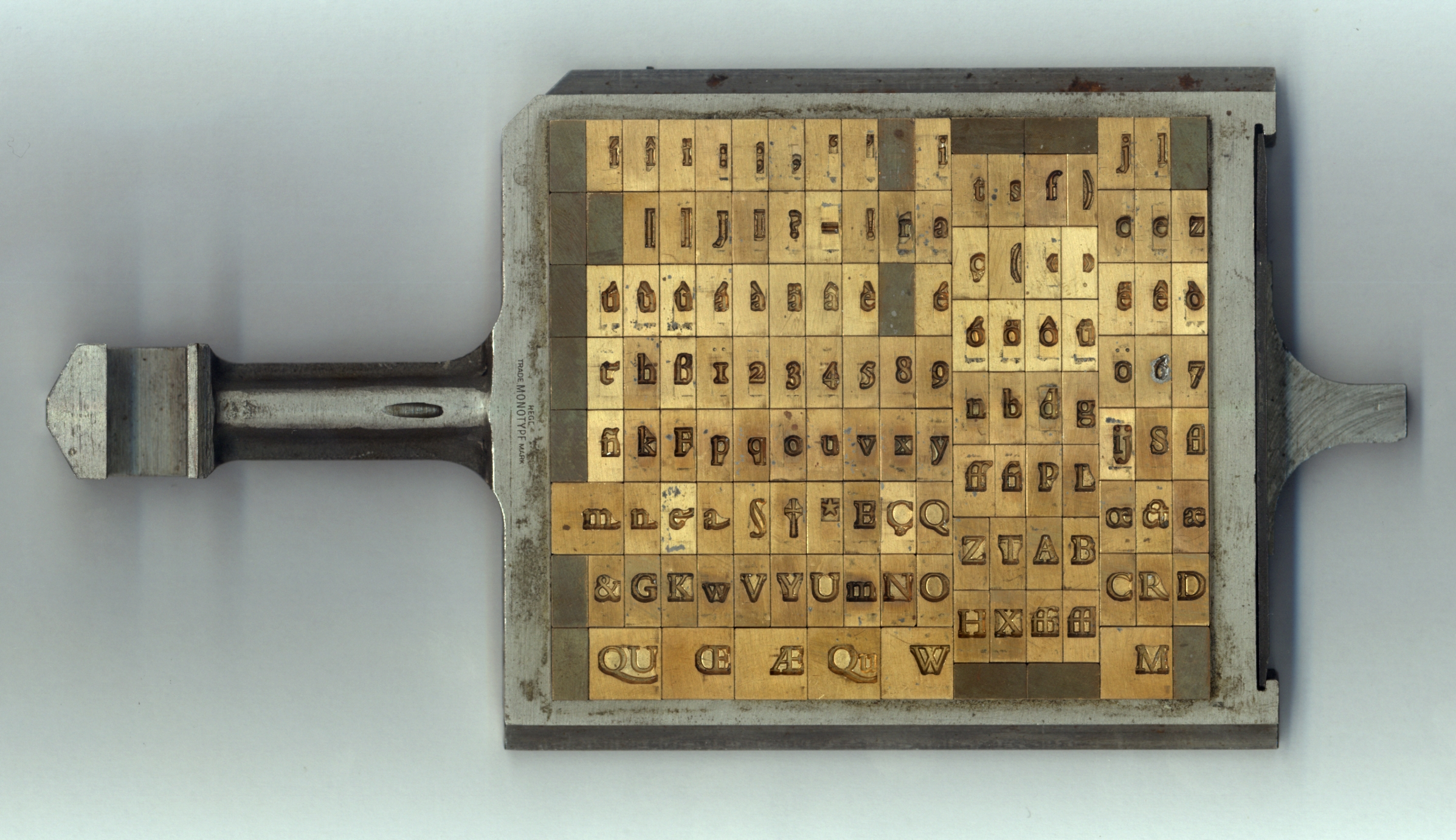
A composition case (not showing Ehrhardt) used to cast metal type on a Monotype machine. The matrices were formed using punches machined from large working drawings and intermediate copper patterns and used to cast type under the control of a keyboard. This gave much cleaner results than punches of Kis's time, which had to be hand-carved at the size of the desired letter.

Ehrhardt's development took place following a series of breakthroughs in printing technology which had occurred over the last fifty years without breaking from the use of metal type. Pantograph engraving had allowed punches to be precisely machined from large plan drawings. This gave a cleaner result than historic typefaces whose master punches had been hand-carved out of steel at the exact size of the desired letter. It also allowed rapid development of a large range of sizes with the same consistent style of letter in all of them, although in fact the design was adjusted to produce a clear image at different sizes, for instance by widening the letters and spacing and increasing the x-height. In addition, hand printing had been superseded by the hot metal typesetting systems of the period, of which Monotype's was one of the most popular (in competition with that of Linotype's). Both allowed metal type to be quickly cast under the control of a keyboard, eliminating the need to manually cast metal type and slot it into place into a printing press. With no need to keep type in stock, just the matrices used as moulds to cast the type, printers could use a wider range of fonts and there was increasing demand for varied typefaces. Artistically, meanwhile, the preference for using mechanical, geometric Didone letterforms introduced in the eighteenth and nineteenth centuries was being displaced by a revival of interest in "old-style" serif fonts developed before this, a change that has proved to be lasting. At the same time, hot metal typesetting had imposed new restrictions: in Monotype's system (while less restrictive than Linotype's), in order to mechanically count the number of characters that could be fitted on a line, letters could only be certain widths, and care was needed to produce letters that looked harmonious in spite of this.

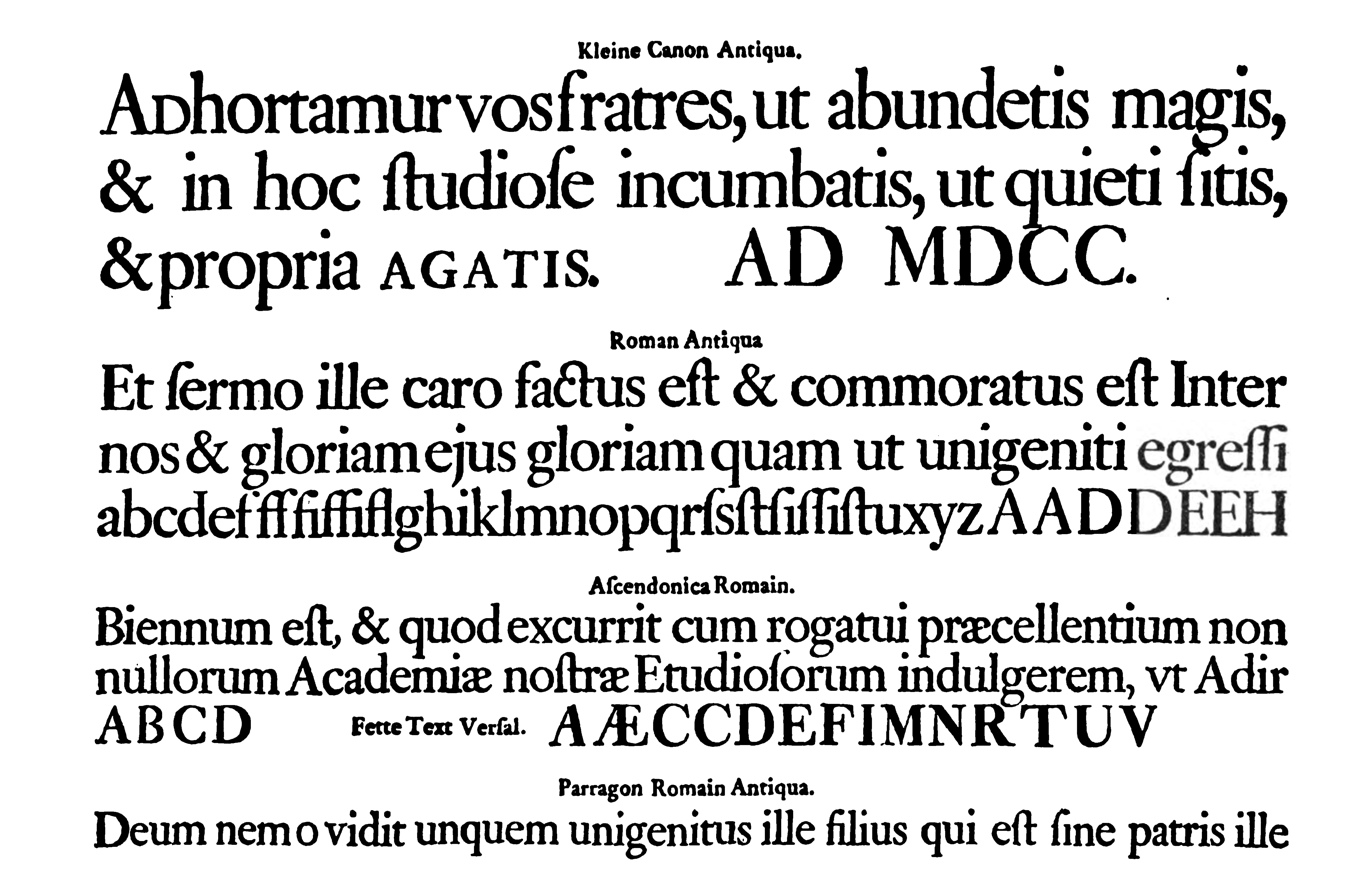
Roman types from the Ehrhardt specimen used as a source by Monotype. The larger sizes are more condensed than the smaller ones on which Ehrhardt and Janson are based.

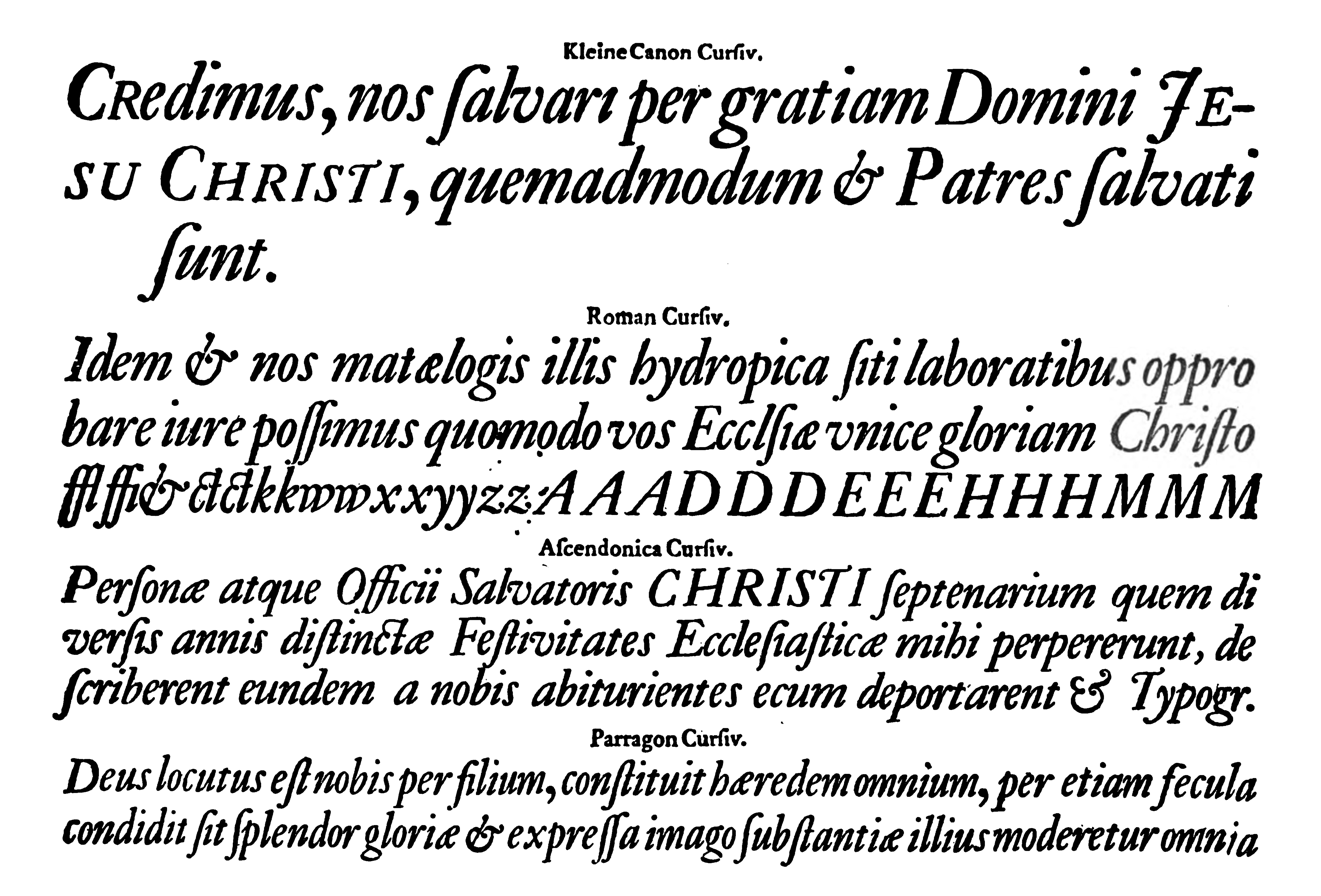
Italic types from the Ehrhardt specimen

Monotype developed a revival of the Ehrhardt typefaces using a rediscovered specimen sheet as a source, while simultaneously also working on Van Dijck, a revival of the work of Christoffel van Dijck (d. 1669), a slightly earlier Dutch Baroque punch-cutter. Ehrhardt's original working title was 'Old Holländische', according to veteran Monotype designer Robin Nicholas.

Developed by the Monotype drawing office team in Salfords, Surrey, led by Fritz Steltzer, the project veered away from a purely faithful revival towards a denser, more condensed design. This differentiated it from the other Janson revivals on the market. Nicholas commented "I think it was Morison's take on Janson - made a little heavier and narrower to give improved legibility and economy." Typesetting expert Yannis Haralambous wrote of being told by a Monotype manager that the typeface was designed particularly for sale in Germany "to appeal to those who have a weakness for Fraktur" (blackletter or 'Gothic' typefaces, still very popular in Germany in the 1930s). In its dense design it may be able to complement blackletter well, and Morison in his article on Leipzig printing suggested that this might have been a motivation behind the original's design style. Ehrhardt's technical production followed Monotype's standard method of the period. The characters were drawn on paper in large plan diagrams by the highly experienced drawing office team, led and trained by Steltzer, who Monotype had recruited from the German printing industry. The drawing staff who executed the design was disproportionately female and in many cases recruited from the local area and the nearby Reigate art school. A wax-copy was made from these drawing, the wax-copy was used to produce a lead plate with the design. These plates were then used as a plan for machining metal punches to stamp matrices in the Benton-pantographs. It was Monotype's standard practice at the time to first engrave a limited number of characters and print proofs from them to test overall balance of colour on the page, before completing the remaining characters.

The finished design was first displayed in Monotype's journal, the Monotype Recorder, in 1938 with an unsigned blurb in what Carter would later call "the accents of Morison". Morison's article on the history of printing in Leipzig would later be typeset in it and it was also used to set a festschrift on his work after his death.

== Distinctive features ==
Distinctive features of Ehrhardt include an 'A' with gently curving bar matching the centre-link of the 'B', a wide 'T' with spreadeagled serifs on either side and a 'b' with no foot on the left. In italic the 'J' has a crossbar, the 'w' has sharp reverse curves towards the top and left, and the 'v' has a flourish on the left. The face has high stroke contrast (difference between thick and thin strokes) by the standards of most old-style serif fonts. In order to allow compact line spacing, descenders were kept reasonably short.

== Reception ==
Ehrhardt attracted considerable attention on its initial release; Monotype's publicity material blurbed it as "in the opinion of some authorities, the most important new book face since Times New Roman". However Ehrhardt remains considerably less well-known than many of Monotype's other classic serif designs of the interwar period, such as Times, Perpetua, Garamond or Bembo. (Note: An assessment of Ehrhardt was (apparently) made as part of a programme of assessing common book faces for educational use by controversial psychologist Cyril Burt, now widely suspected to have fabricated research. The assessment claimed that readers liked it least of all old-style faces surveyed, noting its unusual italic 'w' and text figure 0 in the form of an unstressed circle.)

Harry Carter (who with George Buday made the modern attribution to Kis) wrote that "the letters of Monotype Ehrhardt are like those of the Janson, but the appearance of a page set in it is different. The Janson is more rotund and has greater contrast of thick and thin." Writing in the 1970s, Carter had misgivings about the condensation, saying that it came close to turning Kis's work into an "accurate drudge" but that "it is a successful type-face". He also suggested that some condensed typefaces made by Kis and sold to the Ducal printing establishment in Florence might have made for a more authentic model. Printing historian James Mosley's review of Morison's memoir, A Tally of Types, described the original metal type as "crudely drawn" compared with some earlier Monotype designs, and suggested that this was due to a change in works management at Monotype with the retirement of head engineer Frank Hinman Pierpont.

Notable books set in Ehrhardt include the Oxford World's Classics series, the New English Bible, the Pelican Shakespeare, the Penguin 60s and Hugh Williamson's textbook Methods of Book Design. It has also been used by Faber and Faber and The Iconic magazine. An extremely rare infant variant of the typeface also exists, which can be seen in the American edition of the book Hey! Get off Our Train by John Burningham.

== Extensions ==
Monotype later created a bold and bold italic (called a semi-bold in some digitisations) to match the roman and italic of the original release. (True bold type did not exist in Kis's time.) Released in 1967, Fleet Titling was a capitals-only alphabet intended to serve as a companion for titling use. It was created by Monotype's occasional collaborator John Peters, a Cambridge University Press designer who also worked as a private printer. Monotype used it for their logo and letterhead. More oddly, Monotype in the 1960s used Ehrhardt as a base for printing in the Initial Teaching Alphabet. This alphabet system, intended to be used to teach children to read, used alternative characters for different sounds spelled with the same letter, like t's and c's dropped below the baseline of the text.

== Digitizations and alternative versions ==
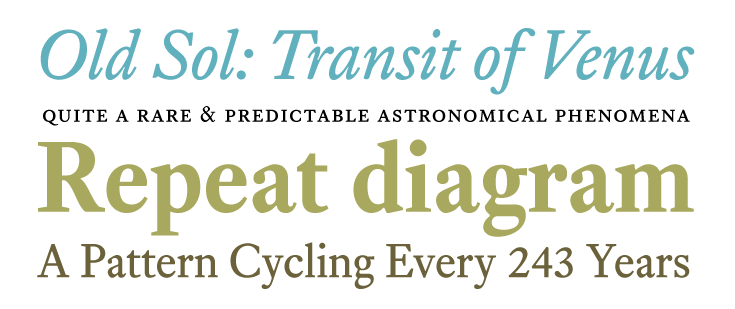
A sample of unofficial Ehrhardt revival Equity, by Matthew Butterick.

Monotype has digitised Ehrhardt into the TrueType and OpenType font formats. It is sold in standard and professional releases, some releases including text figures and small caps (in the roman style only). Like several other Monotype typefaces digitised in the early period of computerised publishing, it is sold under two releases credited both to Monotype itself and to Adobe, the latter only in the standard version without small caps. Fleet Titling and the Initial Teaching Alphabet version have not been digitised.

Matthew Butterick created a revival of Ehrhardt called Equity, whose design was inspired by his experiences of office needs from working as a lawyer. Equity has two grades designed to suit different types of paper and printers, known as Equity A and Equity B, the former of which is darker. Each grade has two weights (Regular and Bold), along with their respective italics, totalling four styles each. The typeface has separate small caps fonts intended for use in Word, although the latest versions also include main font files that can activate small caps as OpenType features. The roman style of Equity is designed to be metrically similar (but not identical) to Times New Roman, while the metric of the italic style is considerably different.

Font Bureau also created the very large revival family Kis. Unlike other digitisations, this has been released in optical sizes, with a separate display-size font intended for headlines. It is used by the Los Angeles Times but (as of 2015) has not been released for online sale. (Note: Another design named Kis has been offered for sale by Bitstream Inc. and its Russian licensee Paratype; it is reportedly based on Linotype Janson.)
