= Ehrhart =

Ehrhart is a surname. Notable people with the surname include:

- Eugène Ehrhart (1906–2000), French mathematician who introduced Ehrhart polynomials in the 1960s
- Gustav Ehrhart (1894–1971), German chemist who synthesized the first fully synthetic opioid analgesic, methadone
- Jakob Friedrich Ehrhart (1742–1795), German botanist for whom a genus of grasses, Ehrharta, is named

== See also ==
- Ehrhart Neubert (born 1940), a retired German Evangelical minister and theologian
- Erhard
- Ehrhardt
- Erhardt
