= Härtl =

Härtl is a German surname. It was derived from the German word hart ('hard', 'tough'), but for some bearers it may have arisen as a derivation from the given names Hartmann, Erhart, etc. A Czechised form of the surname is Hertl. Notable people with the surname include:

- Roger Härtl, American neurosurgeon
- Valentin Härtl (1894–1966), German violist and violinist

== See also ==
- Hartl (surname)
