= Erhardt (given name) =

Erhardt, Ehrhardt are masculine Germanic dithematic given names, from Old High German for "Ehre" = honour and "hard" = strong. Notable people with the name include:

- Ehrhardt Heller, Canadian ice hockey defenceman
- Erhardt Jensen (1887-1944), Danish footballer
- Erhardt Kapp, Romanian-American soccer player
- Ehrhardt Koch, German-American businessman
- Erhardt Stoettner (1899–1992), American stained glass artist

== See also ==
- Erhardt (surname)
- Erhard
