= Frankfurt Lions =

Ice hockey team

- City: Frankfurt
- League: DEL (1994–2010)
- Founded: 1994 (1991 as: FESC)
- Folded: 2010
- Home arena: Eissporthalle Frankfurt (capacity: 6,946)
- Colours

Franchise history
- Frankfurt Lions

The Frankfurt Lions were a professional men's ice hockey club from Frankfurt, Germany, that played in the Deutsche Eishockey Liga from 1994 to 2010. The club's greatest sporting achievement was winning the German championship in the 2003–04 DEL season. The Frankfurt Lions were known for their modern presentation, cosmopolitan character and strong attendance at the Eissporthalle Frankfurt. Their most successful period coincided with Frankfurt's growing importance as an international economic and cultural centre. The club ceased operations in 2010. Its colours were turquoise, white and black.

== History ==
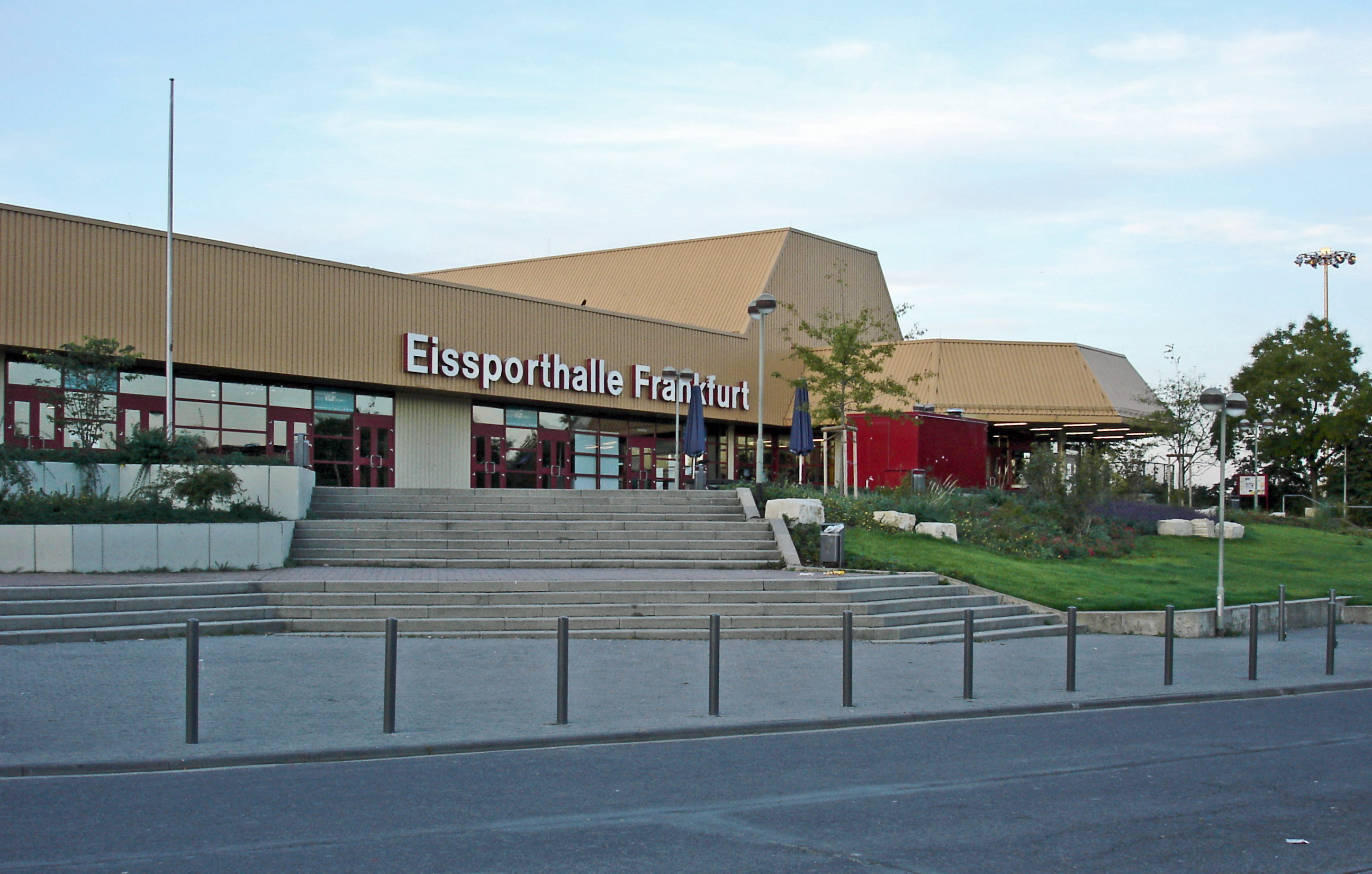
The Eissporthalle am Ratsweg in Frankfurt during the Frankfurt Lions era, before large-scale exterior advertising was added and the adjacent green space was redeveloped.

Ice hockey has been played in Frankfurt since at least the 1930s. In 1959, Eintracht Frankfurt established an ice hockey department of its own. After the department was dissolved, the independent Frankfurter ESC "Die Löwen" was founded in March 1991.

The new club adopted turquoise as its defining colour, an unusual choice in European ice hockey at the time. Together with white and black, turquoise subsequently became closely associated with professional ice hockey in Frankfurt.

With the establishment of the Deutsche Eishockey Liga (DEL), the Frankfurt Lions Eishockey GmbH was founded on 25 March 1994. The Frankfurt Lions became one of the founding members of the new top-level professional league.

=== Early DEL years ===
During the 1994–95 NHL lockout, Frankfurt signed Czech international Robert Reichel. Another prominent player of the early Lions era was Jiří Lála, who had already played for Frankfurt's predecessor teams and again became one of the club's leading scorers.

In their inaugural DEL season in 1994–95, the Lions qualified for the playoffs but were eliminated by the Kassel Huskies. Frankfurt again reached the postseason in 1995–96, only to be eliminated by Kassel for a second consecutive year.

The 1996–97 season proved considerably more difficult. A roster increasingly influenced by Finnish players failed to qualify for the playoffs, and Frankfurt had to secure its DEL status through the relegation round. At the same time, attendance declined and the professional organisation came under increasing sporting and financial pressure.

=== Rebuilding under Gerd Schröder ===
A major turning point came in early 1997. On 31 January 1997, businessman Gerd Schröder acquired the shares of the other owners of Frankfurt Lions Eishockey GmbH and subsequently became the company's sole shareholder. Under Schröder, the Lions underwent a comprehensive restructuring. Administration, marketing and sporting operations were reorganised, while the club introduced a redesigned visual identity, new uniforms and a new logo.

Canadian Bernie Johnston was appointed to rebuild the playing squad. Only a small number of players from the previous season remained, while 17 new players were signed, including eleven Canadians. Among the newcomers were John Chabot and future long-serving captain Michael Bresagk.

The changes had an immediate effect. Frankfurt finished second in the regular season in 1997–98, defeated the Hannover Scorpions in the quarter-finals and reached the DEL semi-finals for the first time, where the Lions lost to eventual champions Adler Mannheim. Their league position also qualified Frankfurt for the European Hockey League, then the leading European club competition.

The Lions again reached the semi-finals in 1998–99 after defeating the Kölner Haie in a five-game quarter-final series. They were eliminated by the Nürnberg Ice Tigers. In 1999–2000 Frankfurt reached the quarter-finals, losing the deciding fifth game against the eventual champions, the München Barons.

=== Sporting decline and survival in 2003 ===
The following seasons were less successful and were marked by frequent changes in coaching and management. Frankfurt missed the playoffs in both 2000–01 and 2001–02.

The low point came in the 2002–03 season. Frankfurt finished 13th in the regular season and faced the Schwenninger Wild Wings in the relegation playoffs. Despite finishing the regular season 25 points ahead of Schwenningen, the Lions lost the series 2–4 and were therefore relegated on sporting grounds.

However, Schwenningen subsequently lost its DEL licence following insolvency proceedings. Frankfurt consequently remained in the league.

The reprieve proved to be one of the most significant turning points in DEL history.

=== 2004 German championship ===
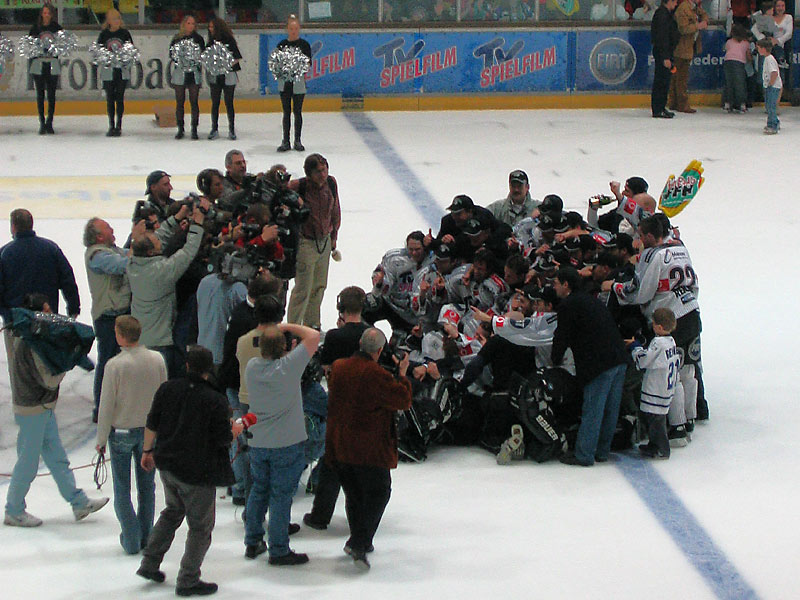
The Frankfurt Lions after winning the German championship against the Eisbären Berlin on April, 16 2004

For the 2003–04 season, Frankfurt substantially rebuilt the roster under head coach Rich Chernomaz. The Lions finished fifth in the regular season before producing their strongest performances during the playoffs. Frankfurt defeated the Kölner Haie 4–2 in the quarter-finals and the Hamburg Freezers 3–2 in the semi-finals to reach the championship final for the first time. In the final, the Lions faced the favoured Eisbären Berlin. Frankfurt won the best-of-five series 3–1 and secured the German championship with a 4–3 home victory on 16 April 2004.

The championship, coming only one year after the club had been relegated on sporting grounds, represented the greatest achievement in the history of the Frankfurt Lions.

Canadian forward Patrick Lebeau played a central role in the championship season. He recorded 23 goals and 46 assists during the regular season, finishing as the DEL's leading scorer and being named the league's most valuable player. Other key members of the championship team included Jesse Bélanger, Dwayne Norris, Michael Bresagk, Paul Stanton and goaltender Ian Gordon.

=== NHL lockout and continued success ===
As defending champions, Frankfurt finished first in the regular-season standings in 2004–05. During the 2004–05 NHL lockout, the Lions strengthened their roster with several established NHL players, most notably Canadian defenceman Stéphane Robidas and American forward Doug Weight.

Frankfurt again reached the DEL semi-finals but was eliminated by Adler Mannheim.

The Lions missed the playoffs in 2005–06 but returned the following season. In 2006–07, Frankfurt defeated defending champions Eisbären Berlin in the pre-playoffs, including a 6–0 victory in the deciding game, before losing to Adler Mannheim in the quarter-finals.

=== 2008 playoff run ===
The 2007–08 season produced another major playoff run. Frankfurt finished fourth in the regular season and faced the Iserlohn Roosters in the quarter-finals.

The series became one of the most notable playoff matchups in DEL history. Game 2 in Iserlohn lasted 117 minutes and 47 seconds of playing time and, at the time, was the longest game in German professional ice hockey history.

After falling behind 1–3 in the series, Frankfurt won three consecutive games to take the quarter-final 4–3. The Lions became the first DEL team to overcome a 1–3 deficit in a best-of-seven series.

Frankfurt subsequently lost a close semi-final series against the Kölner Haie. It proved to be the club's final appearance in the DEL semi-finals.

Between 1998 and 2008, the Frankfurt Lions reached the DEL semi-finals five times.

=== Final seasons and dissolution ===
Despite its popularity, the club faced increasing financial pressure, partly due to the strong competition for sponsors and public attention from football in Frankfurt. After the Frankfurt Lions were unable to meet the financial requirements for the 2010–11 DEL season, the professional organisation ceased operations in 2010. A separate club, Löwen Frankfurt, subsequently began playing in the lower-tier Regionalliga and continued the tradition of professional ice hockey in the city.

=== International character and club identity ===
Throughout their DEL era, the Lions regularly fielded internationally composed squads. Players from Canada, the United States, Finland, the Czech Republic, Russia and other European hockey nations became an important part of the club's sporting identity.

Internationally recognised players who appeared for Frankfurt included Robert Reichel, Jiří Lála, Jukka Tammi, John Chabot, Len Barrie, Patrick Lebeau, Stéphane Robidas and Doug Weight.

From the late 1990s onward, the Lions also developed a distinctive public image. Turquoise, white and black remained the club's defining colours, while the professional organisation combined traditional standing-terrace fan culture at the Eissporthalle Frankfurt with a presentation increasingly influenced by North American professional sports.

The home arena became one of the most heavily attended venues in German ice hockey. From the 2003–04 through 2008–09 seasons, average attendance at Frankfurt home games exceeded 6,100 spectators.

== Notable players ==
=== Goaltenders ===
- Jukka Tammi – 1996–1999
- Ian Gordon – 2003–2008

=== Defencemen ===
- Michael Bresagk – 1997–2010
- Paul Stanton (ice hockey) – 2002–2004
- Stéphane Robidas – 2004–2005
- Chris Snell – 1998–2000, 2001–2002

=== Forwards ===
- Trevor Erhardt – 1983–1988, 1991–1993
- Jiří Lála – 1989–1991, 1994–1996
- Robert Reichel – 1994, 1995–1996
- John Chabot – 1997–2000
- Len Barrie – 1997–1999
- Patrick Lebeau – 2002–2007
- Doug Weight – 2004–2005
- Ilja Vorobyov – 1993–1999, 2007–2010
- Roger Nicholas – 1989–1991, 1992–1994
- Charlie Simmer – 1988–1989
- Andrej Jaufmann – 1992–1995

=== Retired numbers ===
- Trevor Erhardt (#27)

== Achievements ==
- The Lions won the DEL championship in 2004.

Position	Name
Goaltenders:	Ian Gordon, Marc Dillmann
Defensemen:	Peter Ratchuk, Paul Stanton, François Bouchard, Jonas Stöpfgeshoff, Mikael Magnusson, Sebastian Klenner, Markus Jocher, Daniel Peters, Michael Bresagk
Forwards:	Pat Lebeau, Jesse Belanger, Jason Young, Dwayne Norris, David Gosselin, Martin Reichel, Mike Harder, Michael Hackert, David Sulkovsky, Christian Kohmann, Mark Etz, Robert Francz
