= Jesse Bélanger =

Canadian ice hockey player (born 1969)

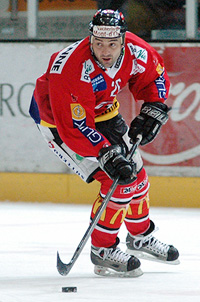
- Born: June 15, 1969 (age 57) Saint-Georges, Quebec, Canada
- Height: 6 ft 1 in (185 cm)
- Weight: 192 lb (87 kg; 13 st 10 lb)
- Position: Centre
- Shot: Right
- Played for: Montreal Canadiens; Florida Panthers; Vancouver Canucks; Edmonton Oilers; SC Herisau; New York Islanders; Hamburg Freezers; Frankfurt Lions
- NHL draft: Undrafted
- Playing career: 1991–2013

Joseph Jesse Dave Bélanger (born June 15, 1969) is a Canadian former professional ice hockey centre, who played in the National Hockey League from 1991 to 2001.

== Playing career ==
As a youth, he played in the 1981 and 1982 Quebec International Pee-Wee Hockey Tournaments with a minor ice hockey team from Saint-Georges, Quebec.

Despite an excellent junior career with the Granby Bisons during which he twice topped 100 points, Bélanger was never selected in the NHL entry draft. He signed as a free agent with the Montreal Canadiens in 1990, and immediately showed his talent, scoring 98 points for the Fredericton Canadiens of the American Hockey League.

Bélanger spent three seasons in the Montreal organization but struggled to crack a deep, talented team full-time. He was recalled for 4 games in 1991–92, and received a 19-game stint in the NHL in 1992–93, during which he scored his first 4 NHL goals and added 2 assists for 6 points. He was on the team's roster for the 1993 playoffs and appeared in 9 games, helping Montreal win their 24th Stanley Cup.

Bélanger received his big break the next summer when he was exposed in the 1993 NHL Expansion Draft and claimed by the Florida Panthers. In Florida he received a chance to play regularly, and responded finely in 1993–94, posting 17 goals and a team-leading 33 assists for 50 points. He earned NHL Player of the Week honors in January 1994. He would follow up with another strong season in the lockout-shortened 1994–95 campaign, leading the Panthers with 15 goals and 29 points in 47 games.

In 1995–96, Bélanger was again amongst the Panthers' leading scorers when he was dealt to the Vancouver Canucks at the trade deadline. He finished the season with 42 points including a career-high 20 goals, but struggled in Vancouver and was a healthy scratch in the playoffs.

Released by Vancouver, Bélanger signed with the Edmonton Oilers for the 1996–97 season, but he failed to crack their roster and appeared in only 6 games as an Oiler. This began a five-year stretch where he spent most of his time in the minors and bounced from organization to organization, seeing only brief stints of NHL action. The highlight of this period was a return to Montreal in 1999–2000, during which he played well and recorded 3 goals and 9 points in 16 games. A pointless 12-game stint with the New York Islanders in 2000–01 would effectively mark the end of his NHL career.

Bélanger spent the final four seasons of his career in Europe playing in Germany and Switzerland. In 2003–2004, he finished 2nd in scoring in the German DEL, and helped the Frankfurt Lions to the league championship. In 2004–2005 and 2005–2006, he was the top scorer of the EHC Biel before going to play for the Lausanne hockey club.

In 246 NHL games, Bélanger recorded 59 goals and 76 assists for 135 points, along with 56 penalty minutes. He ended his playing career after 6 seasons in the LNAH with Saint-Georges on August 9, 2013.

== Career statistics ==
			Regular season					Playoffs
Season	Team	League	GP	G	A	Pts	PIM	GP	G	A	Pts	PIM
1987–88	Granby Bisons	QMJHL	69	33	43	76	10	5	3	3	6	0
1988–89	Granby Bisons	QMJHL	67	40	63	103	26	4	0	5	5	0
1989–90	Granby Bisons	QMJHL	67	53	54	107	53	—	—	—	—	—
1989–90	Canada	Intl	1	0	0	0	0	—	—	—	—	—
1990–91	Fredericton Canadiens	AHL	75	40	58	98	30	6	2	4	6	0
1991–92	Fredericton Canadiens	AHL	65	30	41	71	26	7	3	3	6	2
1991–92	Montreal Canadiens	NHL	4	0	0	0	0	—	—	—	—	—
1992–93	Fredericton Canadiens	AHL	39	19	32	51	24	—	—	—	—	—
1992–93	Montreal Canadiens	NHL	19	4	2	6	4	9	0	1	1	0
1993–94	Florida Panthers	NHL	70	17	33	50	16	—	—	—	—	—
1994–95	Florida Panthers	NHL	47	15	14	29	18	—	—	—	—	—
1995–96	Florida Panthers	NHL	63	17	21	38	10	—	—	—	—	—
1995–96	Vancouver Canucks	NHL	9	3	0	3	4	3	0	2	2	2
1996–97	Edmonton Oilers	NHL	6	0	0	0	0	—	—	—	—	—
1996–97	Hamilton Bulldogs	AHL	6	4	3	7	0	—	—	—	—	—
1996–97	Quebec Rafales	IHL	47	34	28	62	18	9	3	5	8	13
1997–98	SC Herisau	NDA	5	4	3	7	4	—	—	—	—	—
1997–98	Las Vegas Thunder	IHL	54	32	36	68	20	4	0	1	1	0
1998–99	Cleveland Lumberjacks	IHL	22	9	13	22	10	—	—	—	—	—
1999–2000	Quebec Citadelles	AHL	36	15	18	33	20	3	0	3	3	4
1999–2000	Montreal Canadiens	NHL	16	3	6	9	2	—	—	—	—	—
2000–01	New York Islanders	NHL	12	0	0	0	2	—	—	—	—	—
2000–01	Chicago Wolves	IHL	58	17	22	39	28	14	3	4	7	10
2001–02	HC La Chaux–de–Fonds	SUI.2	36	41	39	80	38	5	4	9	13	8
2002–03	Saint–Georges Garaga	QSPHL	12	9	11	20	2	—	—	—	—	—
2002–03	Hamburg Freezers	DEL	39	16	25	41	14	5	2	2	4	2
2003–04	Frankfurt Lions	DEL	50	24	30	54	24	15	3	8	11	10
2004–05	EHC Biel	SUI.2	38	29	37	66	24	1	0	0	0	0
2005–06	EHC Biel	SUI.2	40	38	34	72	28	17	21	18	39	14
2006–07	Lausanne HC	SUI.2	41	48	32	80	60	10	5	2	7	2
2007–08	Saint–Georges CRS Express	LNAH	49	35	44	79	22	11	2	7	9	2
2008–09	Sainte–Marie Poutrelles Delta	LNAH	31	15	28	43	4	—	—	—	—	—
2009–10	Saint–Georges CRS Express	LNAH	44	27	38	65	8	17	12	17	29	4
2010–11	Saint–Georges Cool 103.5 FM	LNAH	37	22	27	49	18	9	4	6	10	4
2011–12	Saint–Georges Cool 103.5 FM	LNAH	47	31	42	73	28	—	—	—	—	—
2012–13	Saint–Georges Cool 103.5 FM	LNAH	37	14	19	33	10	4	1	2	3	2
AHL totals			221	108	152	260	100	16	5	10	15	6
NHL totals			246	59	76	135	56	12	0	3	3	2
QSPHL/LNAH totals			257	153	209	362	92	41	19	32	51	12
