= Hertl =

Hertl (feminine: Hertlová) is a Czech surname, derived from the German surname Härtl. Notable people with the surname include:

- Björn Hertl (born 1976), German footballer
- František Hertl (1906–1973), Czech double bassist and composer
- Jan Hertl (1929–1996), Czech footballer
- Jaroslav Hertl (born 1989), Czech ice hockey player
- Tomáš Hertl (born 1993), Czech ice hockey player

== See also ==
- Hartl (surname)
