= David Sulkovsky =

German ice hockey player (born 1978)

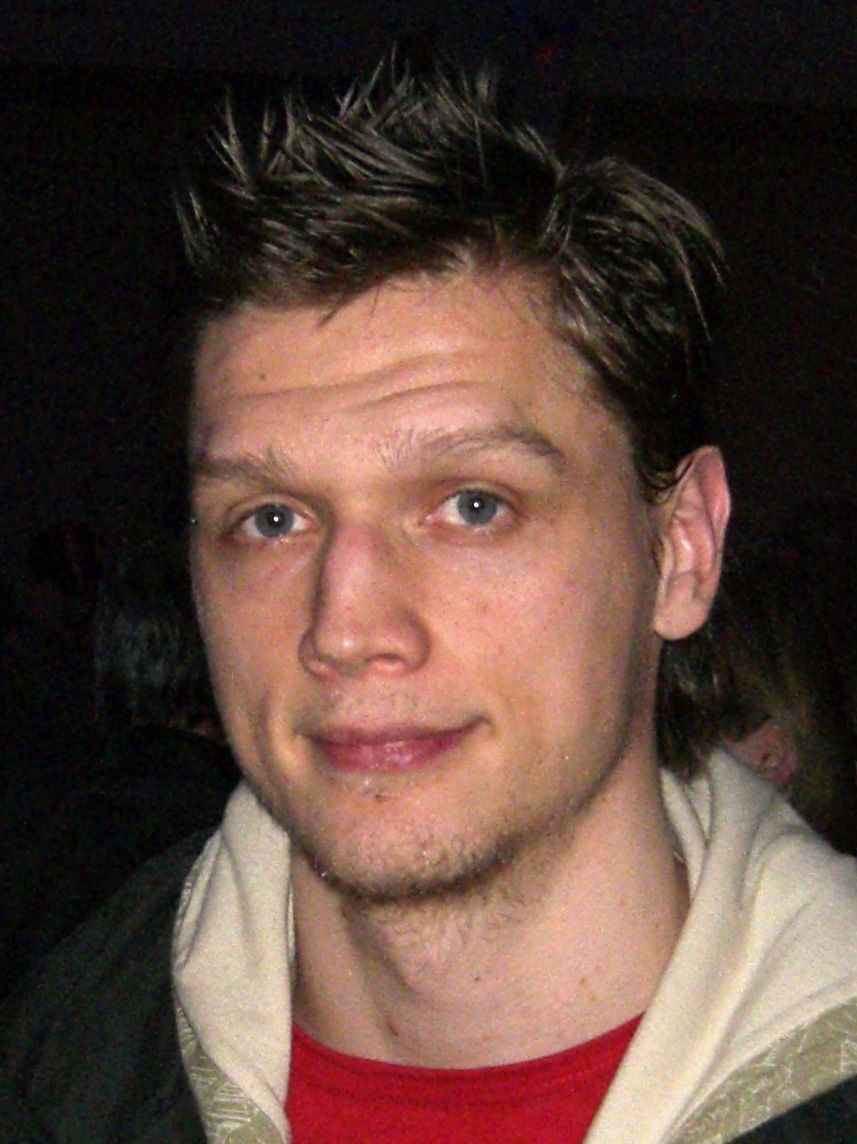
- Sulkovsky in 2007
- Born: 14 June 1978 (age 46); Freiburg, West Germany
- Height: 6 ft 1 in (185 cm)
- Weight: 198 lb (90 kg; 14 st 2 lb)
- Position: Left wing
- Shot: Left
- Played for: Hannover Scorpions; Nürnberg Ice Tigers; Hamburg Freezers; Frankfurt Lions; Iserlohn Roosters; EHC Wolfsburg; Schwenninger Wild Wings
- National team: Germany
- NHL draft: Undrafted
- Playing career: 1999–2014

David Sulkovsky (born 14 June 1978) is a German former professional ice hockey player. He spent 15 years playing with various teams in the Deutsche Eishockey Liga (DEL).
