= Michael Bresagk =

German ice hockey player

- Born: 24 February 1970 (age 56) Cottbus, East Germany
- Height: 6 ft 0 in (183 cm)
- Weight: 185 lb (84 kg; 13 st 3 lb)
- Position: Defence
- Shot: Left
- Played for: ES Weißwasser; EV Landshut; Frankfurt Lions
- National team: Germany
- Playing career: 1990–2010; 2012–2014

Michael Bresagk (born 24 February 1970) is a German former ice hockey defenceman.

== Career ==
Bresagk began his career with PEV Weißwasser and then moved to EV Landshut where he spent five seasons, before moving to France to play in the Ligue Magnus for Brest Albatros Hockey, guiding them to the Magnus Cup in his one season with the club in 1997.

He then moved back to Germany to play for the Frankfurt Lions. He helped the Lions capture the DEL Championship in 2004, their first in history. The achievement marked a complete turnaround for the Lions who in the previous season were supposedly relegated to the 2nd Bundesliga but were allowed back into the DEL due to the financial collapse of the Schwenninger Wild Wings.

However, in later years the Lions themselves would suffer from mounting financial difficulties and subsequently folded after the 2009–10 season despite finishing second in the league. Bresagk would retire as a player afterwards.
