= Matthew Butterick =

American typographer and lawyer (born 1970)

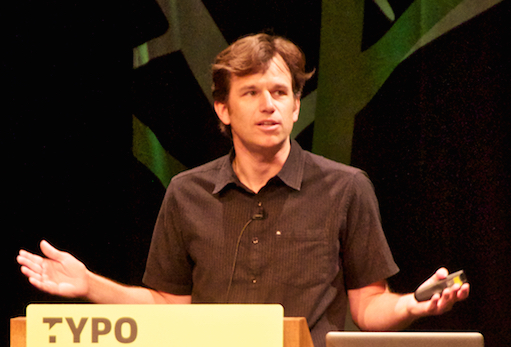
- Born: Matthew James Butterick; November 15, 1970 (age 55); Ann Arbor, Michigan, U.S.
- Education: Harvard University (BA); University of California, Los Angeles (JD)
- Occupations: Writer, Typographer, Computer Programmer
- Spouse: Jessica Coffin Butterick

Matthew Coffin Butterick (born November 15, 1970) is an American typographer, lawyer, writer, and computer programmer. He received the 2012 Golden Pen Award from the Legal Writing Institute for his book Typography for Lawyers, which started as a website in 2008 based on his experience as a practicing attorney. He has worked for The Font Bureau and founded his own website design company, Atomic Vision (purchased by Red Hat in 1999). Expanding Typography for Lawyers, Butterick published Practical Typography as a "web-based book" in July 2013.

Butterick graduated with a BA in visual and environmental studies from Harvard University. He later earned a JD at the University of California, Los Angeles and was admitted to the State Bar of California in 2007.

As of November 2023, Butterick is serving as co-counsel in multiple class action lawsuits against AI companies GitHub and OpenAI (for GitHub Copilot), Stability AI (for Stable Diffusion), Midjourney, and DeviantArt.

== Typefaces ==
Butterick's typeface designs include:

=== For Font Bureau ===
- Wessex (1993), transitional text serif inspired by Bulmer and Caledonia
- Herald Gothic (1993), a bevelled sans-serif
- Berlin Sans (1994, part), a flared sans-serif based on Bernhard Negro
- Hermes (1995), a blocky sans-serif loosely inspired by Berthold Block
- Alix, a typewriter font

=== Self-released ===
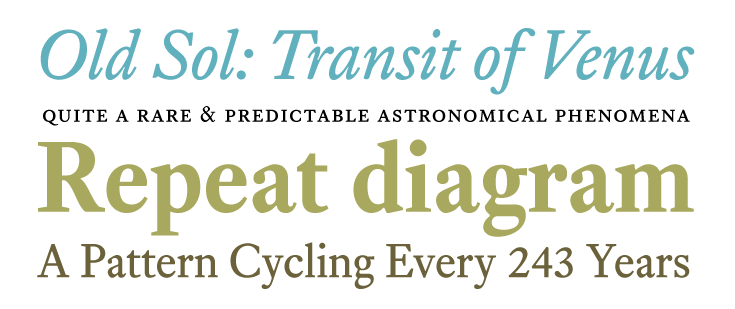
Butterick's serif font Equity

- Equity, an updating of the 1930s body text serif design Ehrhardt. Features weights designed to suit different types of paper and printers and correctly letter-spaced small caps characters.
- Concourse, loosely inspired by Dwiggins’ geometric sans-serif design Metro. Features stylistic alternates and small caps.
- Triplicate, a monospaced slab serif design inspired by typewriter fonts such as the default face used in the IBM Selectric. Essentially a further development of Alix, with more variants including a proportional version and a style designed specifically for displaying code.
- Advocate, a caps-only slab and sans serif design. Reminiscent of mid-century American college sports team lettering, corporate logos and Bank Gothic. Somewhat resembles an expansion of Herald Gothic.
- Heliotrope, an attempt to merge the characteristics of serif and sans serif fonts into a single typeface. It draws loose inspiration from typefaces such as Optima and Albertus.
