= Robert Francz =

German ice hockey player (born 1978)

- Born: March 30, 1978 (age 47); Bad Muskau, East Germany
- Height: 6 ft 2 in (188 cm)
- Weight: 202 lb (92 kg; 14 st 6 lb)
- Position: Left wing
- Shot: Left
- {{{league}}} team Former teams: Retired; Augsburg Panthers; Frankfurt Lions; Hamburg Freezers; Duisburg Foxes; Nuermberg Sinupret Ice Tigers; Kassel Huskies
- NHL draft: 151st overall, 1997; Phoenix Coyotes
- Playing career: 1998–2009

Robert Francz (born March 30, 1978) is a German former ice hockey player.
