= Roger Härtl =

American neurosurgeon

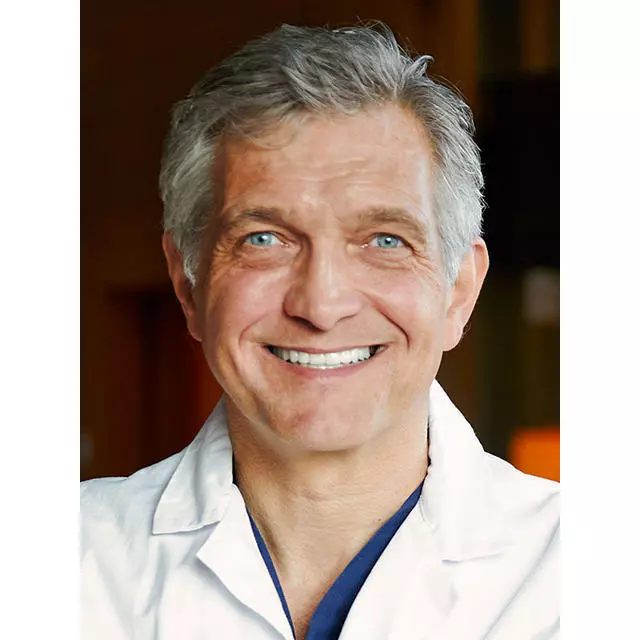
- Occupation: Neurosurgeon
- Known for: Research in neuroscience & neurosurgery
- Scientific career
- Fields: Physician & Neurosurgeon
- Workplaces: Weill Medical College; New York Presbyterian Medical Center
- Website: hartlmd.net

Roger Härtl is an American neurological surgeon at Weill-Cornell Medical College and NewYork-Presbyterian Hospital. He is the Director of Spinal Surgery at the Weill Cornell Brain & Spine Center. Härtl has been named by Becker's Spine Review as one of the Top 50 Spine Surgeons in the United States as well as one of the Top 10 Spine and Neurosurgeon Leaders at Non-Profit Hospitals. He was named one of New York's Top Doctors by New York Magazine after he saved the life of New York firefighter Eugene Stolowski.

== Education ==
Härtl received his M.D. from LMU Munich in Germany. He completed post-doctoral fellowships at the Weill Cornell Medical College as well as the Charité Hospital of the Humboldt University of Berlin, Germany, followed by a surgical internship and residency at Allegheny General Hospital in Pittsburgh, Pennsylvania. He completed his neurosurgery residency at New York-Presbyterian/Weill Cornell Medical Center and Memorial Sloan Kettering Cancer Center, after which he pursued specialized training in complex spine surgery at the Barrow's Neurological Institute in Phoenix under Volker Sonntag. He has worked with Weill Cornell Medical College's Department of Neurosurgery in New York since 2004.

== Books ==
- Biological Approaches to Spinal Disc Repair and Regeneration for Clinicians New York, New York : Thieme Publishers, 2017 ISBN 9781626232501
- Minimally Invasive Spine Surgery: Techniques, Evidence, and Controversies Davos, Switzerland : AOSpine, 2012 ISBN 9783131723819

== Career ==
Härtl's scientific work focuses on traumatic brain injury (TBI) and he has lectured and published on the surgical treatment of spine disorders, traumatic brain injury, and spinal cord injury. In conjunction with the Brain Trauma Foundation in New York, where he serves as a member of the Medical Advisory Board, Härtl helped develop the treatment guidelines for the medical and surgical management of head injury that are used nationwide.

== Grants and awards ==
In 2011, Härtl and his colleague at Cornell in Ithaca, Larry Bonassar, were awarded a $100,000 grant from the NFL to help develop a new generation of artificial discs for the spine.

== Tanzania Neurosurgery Project ==
Härtl and his team bring neurosurgical equipment to Bugando Medical Center and train local surgeons to perform basic neurosurgical procedures. His team trains doctors in Tanzania, providing them with expertise in neurosurgical procedures. Since 2015, Hartl has led an annual course in Tanzania training local providers to treat neurotrauma patients. After the course in 2018, Muhimbili Orthopaedic Institute in Dar Es Salaam announced that the hospital was launching its neurosurgery program.
