= Erhard =

Erhard is a male German given name and surname, and may refer to:

== People ==
- Erhard of Regensburg, bishop of Regensburg in the 7th century
- Erhard Altdorfer (c. 1480–1561), German Early Renaissance printmaker, painter and architect
- Erhard Arnold Julius Dehio (1855–1940), Baltic German merchant and politician, former mayor of Tallinn (1918)
- Erhard Etzlaub (c. 1455 or 1465 – 1532), astronomer, geodesist, cartographer, instrument maker and physician
- Erhard Hegenwald, 16th century writer of the Reformation
- Erhard Wunderlich (1956–2012), German handball player
- Guido Erhard (1969–2002), German footballer
- Ludwig Erhard (1897–1977), Chancellor of West Germany
- Werner Erhard (born 1935), American author and founder of est
  - Erhard Seminars Training, or est

== Fictional characters ==
- Erhard Muller, the real name of CR-SO1 in Trauma Team

== See also ==
- Erhard, Minnesota, a small city in the United States
- St. Erhard (brewery), a German brewery
- Erhart, another given name and surname
- Erhardt
