= Anke Ehrhardt =

American-German psychologist

Anke A. Ehrhardt is a researcher in the field of sexual and gender development of children, adolescents, and adults. Her research has included a range of studies on determinants of sexual risk behavior among children, adolescents, heterosexual women and men, and the gay population, and on comprehensive approaches to preventing HIV and STD infection. Ehrhardt is the Founding Director of the HIV Center for Clinical and Behavioral Studies at the New York State Psychiatric Institute and Columbia University, where she has had a focus on research and advocacy for female-controlled methods of HIV prevention.

Presently, Ehrhardt is the Vice Chair for Academic Affairs and a professor of Medical Psychology in the Columbia University Department of Psychiatry at Columbia University. She is also research division chief for HIV and director of the HIV Center. In addition, she has been a trustee on the board of directors of the Ford Foundation since 1999.

A native of Hamburg, Germany, Ehrhardt completed a doctorate in clinical psychology at the University of Düsseldorf in Germany based on her pioneering work at Johns Hopkins University in the field of human gender and sexual development under the mentorship of sexologist John Money. With Money, she co-authored Man & Woman, Boy & Girl: Gender Identity from Conception to Maturity, a landmark 1972 book in the field of sexuality studies. She was subsequently co-director of the Program of Psychoendocrinology at Children's Hospital, State University of New York at Buffalo. Throughout this period, Ehrhardt has also been a practicing clinical psychologist, working in particular with children with intersex variations and their parents.

Ehrhardt arrived at Columbia University in 1977, and in 1987 founded the HIV Center with what was then the largest single grant ever awarded by the National Institute of Mental Health. Over its more than 20-year history, the HIV Center has conducted groundbreaking work in behavioral research both in the US and abroad. Under Ehrhardt's leadership, the HIV Center has focused in particular on the intersection of HIV infection with gender, sexuality, and mental health.

In recognition of her work, Ehrhardt has been presented with the Distinguished Research Leadership Award from the American Psychological Association in 1986; the Research Award "For Excellence in Research" from the State of New York Office of Mental Health in 1990; the Award for Distinguished Scientific Achievement for 1991 from the Society for the Scientific Study of Sex; and the first Research Award from the National Lesbian and Gay Health Foundation in 1994. Her bibliography includes more than 250 scientific publications.

Ehrhardt was the President of the International Academy of Sex Research in 1981. She has also been a member of the National Institutes of Health (NIH), Office of AIDS Research Advisory Council, the executive committee of the HIV Prevention Trials Network of Family Health International, and the Board of Trustees of the Kinsey Institute for Research in Sex, Gender, and Reproduction. She is an elected Fellow of the Society for the Scientific Study of Sexuality.
