= Trevor Erhardt =

Canadian ice hockey player

- Born: November 27, 1962 (age 62); Calgary, Alberta, Canada
- Height: 5 ft 10 in (178 cm)
- Weight: 176 lb (80 kg; 12 st 8 lb)
- Position: Forward
- Played for: Kapfenberg EC (Austria)
- Playing career: 1983–1994

Trevor Erhardt (born November 27, 1962) is a Canadian former professional ice hockey player.

Erhardt is regarded as one of the crowd favorites in Frankfurt hockey. He played for both the Eintracht Frankfurt, as well as for ESC Frankfurt, and his jersey #27 has been retired in Frankfurt.

In his time at Eintracht Frankfurt, where he played from the 1983–84 season, he was instrumental during the 1985–86 season in the rise to the 1st Bundesliga. In the 1988–89 season he remained in Germany and played with EC Bad Nauheim, before he joined the Austrian Hockey League's Kapfenberg EC for the 1989–90 season.

He did not play the 1990–91 season, but he returned as a player to help in the rebuilding of hockey in Frankfurt, joining Eintracht Frankfurt for the 1991–92 and 1992–93 seasons.

Erhardt was honored for his services to the Frankfurt Hockey with his jersey #27 being retired and hung under the ceiling of the Frankfurt Lions' ice rink. They also named their mascot Trevor in honour of Erhardt.

Now living in Kelowna, British Columbia, Erhardt remains involved hockey as a head coach with the Kelowna Minor Hockey Association.
