= Anton Janson =

Dutch typographer

Anton Janson (January 17, 1620 in Wanden/Wauden? in Friesland – November 18, 1687 in Leipzig) was a Dutch type founder and printer. The typeface Janson is named after him, although it can also be attributed to Hungarian punch-cutter and printer Miklós (Nicholas) Kis (1650–1702).
