= Daniel Berkeley Updike =

American printer and historian of typography

- Born: February 24, 1860; Providence, Rhode Island
- Died: December 28, 1941 (aged 81)
- Occupation: Printer. historian

Daniel Berkeley Updike (February 24, 1860 – December 28, 1941) was an American printer and historian of typography. In 1880 he joined the publishers Houghton, Mifflin & Company, of Boston as an errand boy. He worked for the firm's Riverside Press and trained as a printer but soon moved to typographic design. In 1896 he founded the Merrymount Press.

== Beginnings ==
Daniel Berkeley Updike was born in Providence, Rhode Island, on February 24, 1860, the only child of Caesar Augustus Updike (1824–1877) and Elizabeth Bigelow Adams (1830–1895); he left school when his father died on October 9, 1877. Updike first assisted at a local library after the librarian had taken ill. In the spring of 1880 he relocated to Boston and began work in the publishing office of Houghton, Mifflin and Company, at the lowest level.

Updike's parents were both of English and Dutch-German descent. His mother, who held more traditional views of life, strongly influenced the young Updike. His father's family, the Updikes, were originally from Wesel in present-day Germany and settled New Amsterdam before 1640. His patrilineal great-great-great-great-grandfather, Gysbert Opdyck, came from Wesel to New Amsterdam and Connecticut, and married a daughter of Richard Smith who was one of the earliest and most prominent settlers of Rhode Island. For over 150 years, the seat of the Smith-Updike family was "Smith's Castle" on Narragansett Bay at Wickford, Rhode Island, but his grandfather, the Honorable Wilkins Updike (1784–1867), was forced to sell the homestead in 1812, thereafter practicing in Kingstown, Rhode Island.

Updike's work as an errand boy for Houghton, Mifflin and Company introduced him to the publishing trade, and he rapidly took an interest in the process of book-making. Mature for his age, the young man was socially accepted at the firm. Updike was responsible daily for carrying proofs from the printer's offices on Park Street on Boston's Beacon Hill to the Riverside Press overlooking the Charles River in Cambridge. Traveling by horse-car, Updike made the most of the time: he studied the proofs he was delivering and imagined the changes that he himself would make. At the Press, he would wait for the corrected prints and quickly developed an interest in print-making.

== The Merrymount Press ==
In 1893 Updike opened his own studio, designing type fonts; in 1896 he founded a printing company, the Merrymount Press (named in honor of Mount Wollaston—the original Merry Mount—an early settlement south of Boston). One the first works issued with the Merrymount Press imprint was "In the Old Days, A Fragment," a remembrance of her youth by Updike's mother. Updike was well-known and respected as a printer in the twentieth century; he was also known for his rejection of the philosophy of William Morris. Initially he followed the style of William Morris and the Kelmscott Press but soon turned towards historical printing styles of the seventeenth, eighteenth, and early nineteenth centuries.

Updike is viewed as one of the finest representatives of the Arts and Crafts movement in American book arts, influenced by William Morris. The Merrymount Press was founded "to do common work uncommonly well." Updike was renowned as a liturgical printer for the Episcopal Church, but also undertook general jobbing and ephemeral work. John Bianchi became a partner in the press in 1915.

Updike began to acquire his own fonts. In 1896 he commissioned the font designer Bertram Grosvenor Goodhue to create the Merrymount font to be used for an Episcopal altar book. In 1904 Herbert Horne designed Montallegro, and the noted graphic artist and print designer Rudolph Ruzicka (1883–1978) also produced designs for the press. In 1904, Updike purchased the Caslon face; other types included Scotch Romans, Janson, Mountjoye, and Oxford. Merrymount was the first American firm to use the now widely familiar font, Times New Roman font.

In 1899 the Merrymount Press printed Edith Wharton’s novels for Charles Scribner's Sons. The press's most substantial work is considered to be the Book of Common Prayer printed in 1930 and financed by J. Pierpont Morgan. Without decoration, except a typographic leaf, initial letters, and rubrication, the book is an austere and handsome quarto.

The Merrymount Press is estimated to have produced 14,000 pieces of printing during its run. The majority of its creations were intended for the private collectors market and limited-editions clubs. However, the Press also printed Christmas cards, bookplates, and advertising ephemera, as well as work for publishers, libraries, churches, and other institutions.

The reputation of the Merrymount Press is unlike any other bookmaking house. Merrymount catered to an upper class clientele that appreciated the high quality products Updike produced (and that were not available through ordinary bookmaking houses). Updike was motivated to excel, and the press established a reputation for delivering only the very best obtainable typography, impression, illustrations, and binding. The press retained its high status for some time and is still recognized for its excellence, and its high standing, both in the local community and the important New York market.

The majority of the Merrymount Press archives are conserved at the Boston Athenaeum.

== Recognition ==
Updike and his Merrymount Press were known by publishing firms all over the country; he could always rely on the general market for commissions. This firm had been preceded at Merrymount by Crowell which catered to a wider range reciprocal buyers, not solely from a cultural standing perspective, as did some of its competitors. This was the era of salesmanship. For example, a salesman such as Elbert Hubbard of East Aurora. He had created an eager book-buying clientele of customers for the small-town bookshops, looking for pictorial aspects in the book to go along with the reading aspect of the book. The effects of the press created what is known as mass culture. The press allowed acceleration in the book making process. It created a broader range of buyers and had a hand in the increase of literacy. The ultimate effect of the Merrymount Press was important and it left a permanent impression on bookmaking in the United States.

== Published works ==
Updike was greatly interested in the history of printing types and in 1922 published Printing Types: Their History, Forms and Use. An extensively revised second edition was published in 1937. He was involved in the Anglo-American 'Typographical Renaissance' of the time, together with Frederic Goudy, Stanley Morison, Bruce Rogers, and Theodore Low De Vinne.

Excerpt, Printing Types: Their History, Forms and Use "Ligatured letters became more common and more varied, and from this kind of writing the black letter ultimately is derived".

In 1924 Updike published a collection of his writings on book making, "In the Day's Work."

The Well-Made Book: Essays & Lectures by Daniel Berkeley Updike, collected and edited by William S. Peterson, was published in 2002 and contains many previously unpublished essays and extensive illustrations. C.

== Honors and memberships ==
Daniel Berkeley Updike was elected a member of the American Antiquarian Society in 1904.

Daniel Berkeley Updike was awarded American Library Association Honorary Membership in 1933.
