= Erhart =

Erhart is a surname and a given name. Notable people so named include:

- Gregor Erhart (c. 1470?–1540), German sculptor
- Maria Erhart (1944–2011), Austrian international bridge player
- Michel Erhart (c. 1440-45 — after 1522), German late Gothic sculptor
- Erhard Altdorfer (c. 1480–1561), sometimes spelled Erhart, German Early Renaissance printmaker, painter and architect
- Erhart Aten (1932–2004), Micronesian politician
- Erhart or Erhard Hegenwald, 16th century writer of the Reformation
- Erhart Regier (1916-1976), Canadian politician

== See also ==
- Erhard
- Erhardt
- Erhart, Ohio
