= Patrik Hartl =

Czech author and theater director

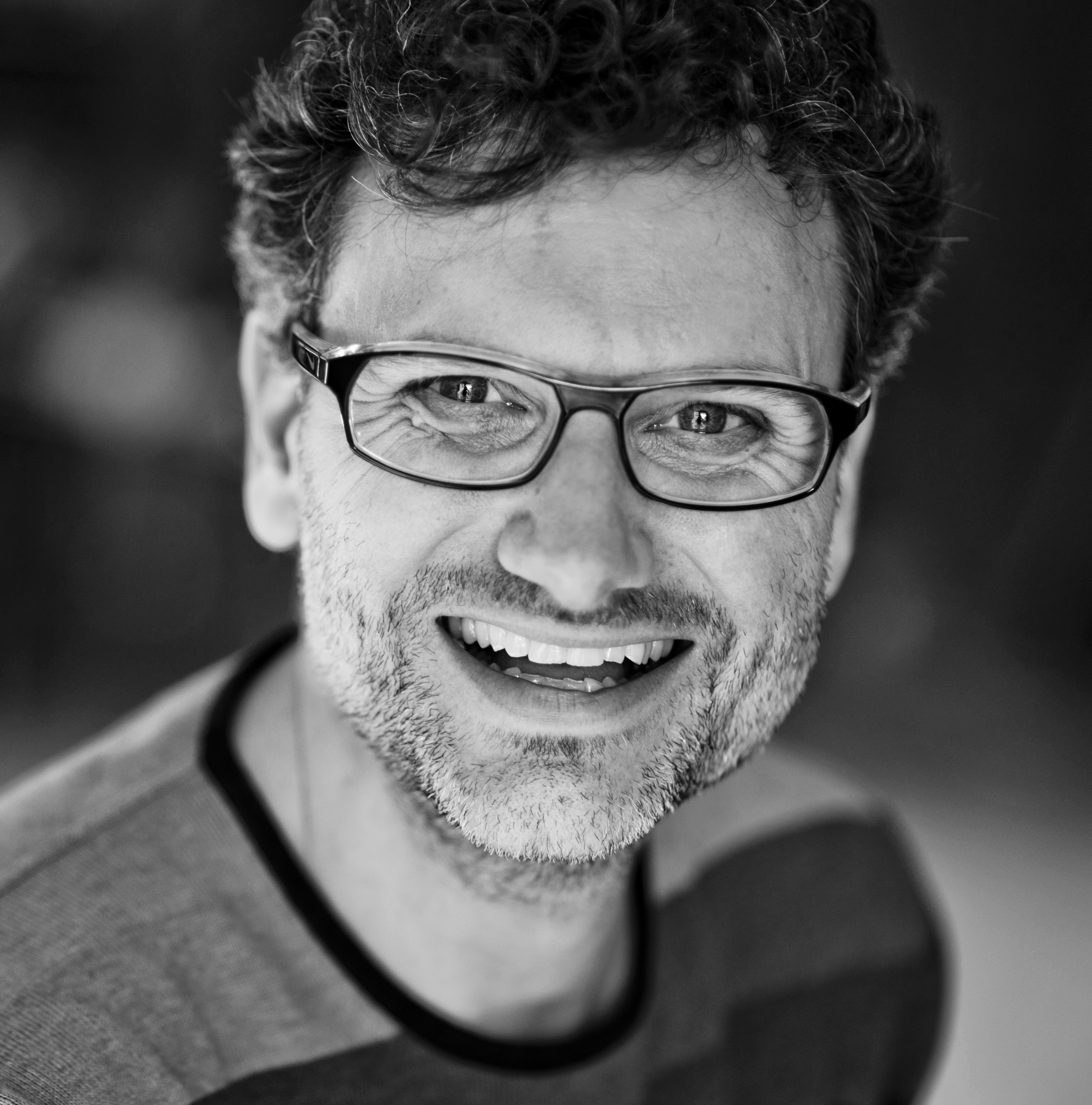
- Born: 10 September 1976 (age 48); Olomouc, Czech Republic
- Education: Film and TV School, Academy of Performing Arts in Prague
- Known for: writer, playwright, theatre and film director
- Notable work: Gazelles, 15 years of love, The Best Weekend; Moments of Happiness; The Prague Lexicon of Love; Doofus, Smarty, Dotty and Carl – novels An Adriatic Honeymoon; 4 Sisters; The Vacuum Cleaner; The Star; Private Talks About Happiness – theatre plays
- Awards: the Czech Best Seller Award (2014, 2016, 2018, 2021)
- Website: patrikhartl.cz

Patrik Hartl (born 10 September 1976 Olomouc) is a contemporary Czech novelist, playwright and theatre director.

== Life and career ==
Patrik Hartl studied film and TV directing at the Academy of Performing Arts in Prague.

He lives and works in Prague. He has written and (as his own director) staged eight comedies, all of which have become box-office hits. Since 2000, he has been an in-house playwright and director at the Studio DVA theatre, an independent theatre company based on Wenceslas Square in central Prague.

His novels have five times won the Czech Best Seller Award for the best-selling new book in the Czech Republic.

== Works ==
=== Theatre comedies ===
(Translations of titles for informational purposes only.)

- Hovory o štěstí mezi čtyřma očima (Private Talks About Happiness; 2004)
- Večírek na Seině (A Party on the Seine; 2005)
- Klára a Bára (Klára and Bára; 2006)
- Soukromý skandál (A Private Scandal; 2011)
- Hlava v písku (Head in Sand; 2013)
- Hvězda (The Star; 2013)
- Vysavač (The Vacuum Cleaner; 2015)
- 4 sestry (4 Sisters; 2016)
- Líbánky na Jadranu (An Adriatic Honeymoon; 2017)
- Lovci bobrů (Beaver Hunters, 2022)

=== Novels ===
(Translations of titles for informational purposes only.)

- Prvok, Šampón, Tečka a Karel (Doofus, Smarty, Dotty and Carl; 2012)
- Malý pražský erotikon (The Prague Lexicon of Love; 2014)
- dvojromán Okamžiky štěstí (Moments of Happiness; 2016)
- Nejlepší víkend (The Best Weekend; 2018)
- 15 roků lásky (15 years of love, 2021)
- Gazely (Gazelles, 2023)
