= Tom Erhardt =

Thomas Joseph Erhardt (13 March 1928 – 28 December 2019) was an American-born theatrical literary agent whose career in British theatre spanned over five decades.

== Early career ==
Born in Grand Rapids, Michigan, Erhardt started his professional working life in 1956, transcribing plays and musicals at New Dramatists Committee in New York. He went on to work as assistant to agent Lucy Kroll who represented clients including; Carl Sandburg, Norman Mailer and James Earl Jones. During those years working for Kroll, Tom was seconded for a while to Oscar Hammerstein, who needed a typist to write up the manuscripts that he and Richard Rodgers were working on, including The Sound of Music.

Moving to London in 1966, Erhardt worked as an assistant to English theatre producer Peter Bridge. Erhardt would also work as an assistant to scriptwriter Larry Kramer on a feature film adaptation of D. H. Lawrence's Women in Love, directed by Ken Russell.

In 1967, Erhardt had his first and only meeting in a London pub with Tennessee Williams. Williams died in 1983. In 1988 the Trustees of the estate, the University of the South, Sewanee, Tennessee, selected Erhardt as the principal worldwide licensing agent for Williams' works.

It was while working with Bridge that Erhardt met British playwright and director Alan Ayckbourn in person for the first time. Erhardt had previously represented his interests in America.

In 1971 Erhardt would be an assistant to director Gene Saks on Alan Ayckbourn's How the Other Half Loves. The production was produced in New York and London by Bridge and Eddie Kulukundis. It was Kulukundis who introduced Erhardt to Margaret "Peggy" Ramsay that same year. Ramsay was one of the foremost theatrical agents working in Britain at the time and saw herself not simply as a literary agent but as an agent of playwrights. Ramsay offered Erhardt a full-time position with her at 14a Goodwins Court, St. Martin's Lane, London.

== Later career ==
Within three years, Ramsay had made Erhardt a director of the company, handling foreign rights and acting as point-person for all of her international clients, including Larry Kramer, Wallace Shawn, Manuel Puig and Václav Havel. During his time, Erhardt helped to represent the careers of many of the most prestigious names in theatre, including; J. B. Priestley, Dame Muriel Spark, Sir Alan Ayckbourn, Sir David Hare, Sir Christopher Hampton, Martin Sherman, Simon Callow, Stephen Poliakoff, Alan Plater, Robert Bolt, Joe Orton, Edward Bond, Caryl Churchill and Willy Russell.

Ramsay's death in 1991 led to Erhardt taking on most of her immense roster of clients. Erhardt was courted heavily by the big agencies. He and Laurence Harbottle were soon approached by Jenne and Giorgio Casarotto, who brought with them expertise in agenting for film and television, while Erhardt's expertise in theatre would succeed in forging an invaluable partnership. In 1992 they joined companies and became Casarotto Ramsay & Associates Limited. Erhardt became company director and head of theatre and worked with his protégé Mel Kenyon for the next twenty-one years until Erhardt's retirement in 2013.

Erhardt continued to work into his eighties, retiring on 20 December 2013. His eighty-sixth birthday was held at St Martin-in-the-Fields.

In celebration of Erhardt's career, Laurence Harbottle and The Peggy Ramsay Foundation set up the Tom Erhardt Award to support new writing for the stage by providing grants to playwrights.

Erhardt died in London on 28 December 2019 at the age of ninety-one.
