= Miklós Tótfalusi Kis =

Hungarian tyographer and printer

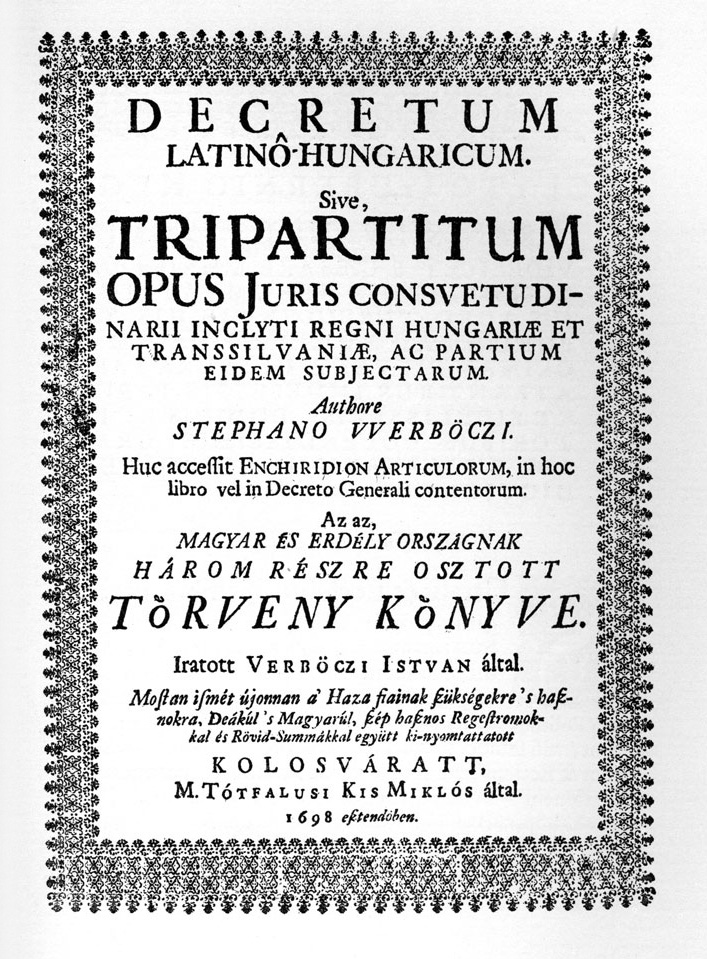
1698 book printed by Kis

Miklós Tótfalusi Kis (Hungarian: Misztótfalusi Kis Miklós), known in English-speaking countries as Nicholas Kis (1650 to March 20, 1702) was a Hungarian letter cutter, typeface designer, typographer and printer. Kis was one of the first printers and letter cutters of the Georgian type letters. He made fonts on the request of the Georgian king Archil II.

== See also ==
- Janson
