= St. Erhard (brewery) =

Brewery in Bamberg, Germany

St. ERHARD GmbH
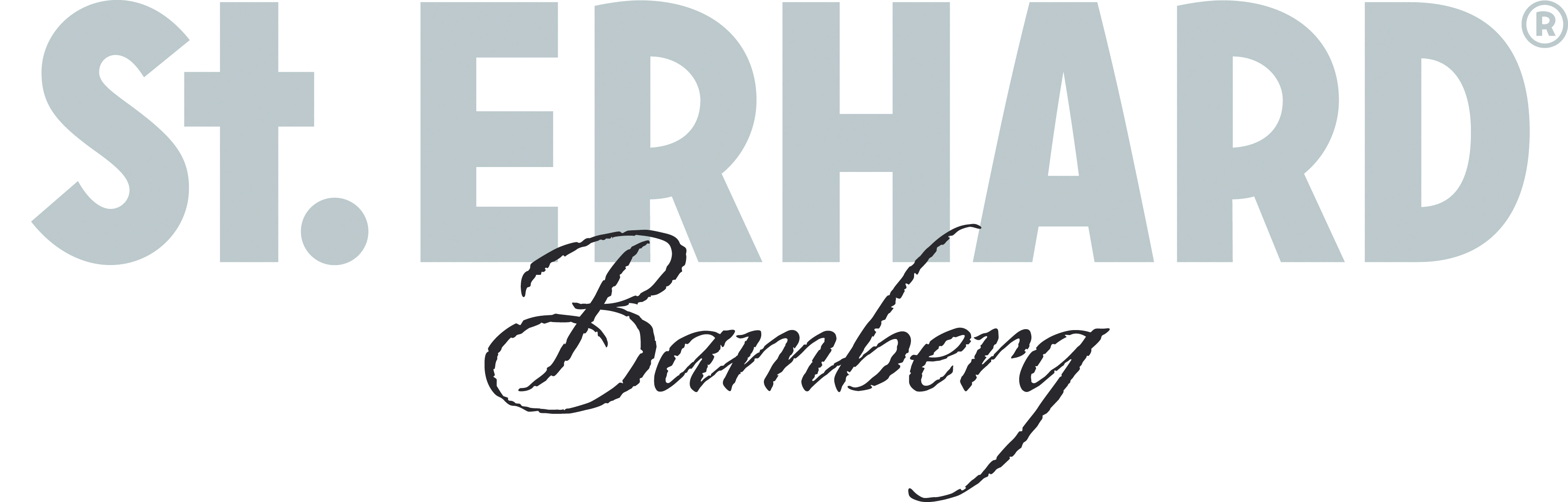
- Interactive map of St. ERHARD GmbH
- Location: Bamberg, Upper Franconia, Bavaria, Germany
- Coordinates: 49°54′32″N 10°52′18″E
- Opened: 2011
- Annual production volume: 1,000 hectolitres (850 US bbl)
- Website: www.st-erhard.com

St. Erhard (officially typeset St. ERHARD) is a German craft brewery from the region of Bamberg in Bavaria. The beer positions itself as a luxury brand and is predominantly exported to Asia.

== Product ==
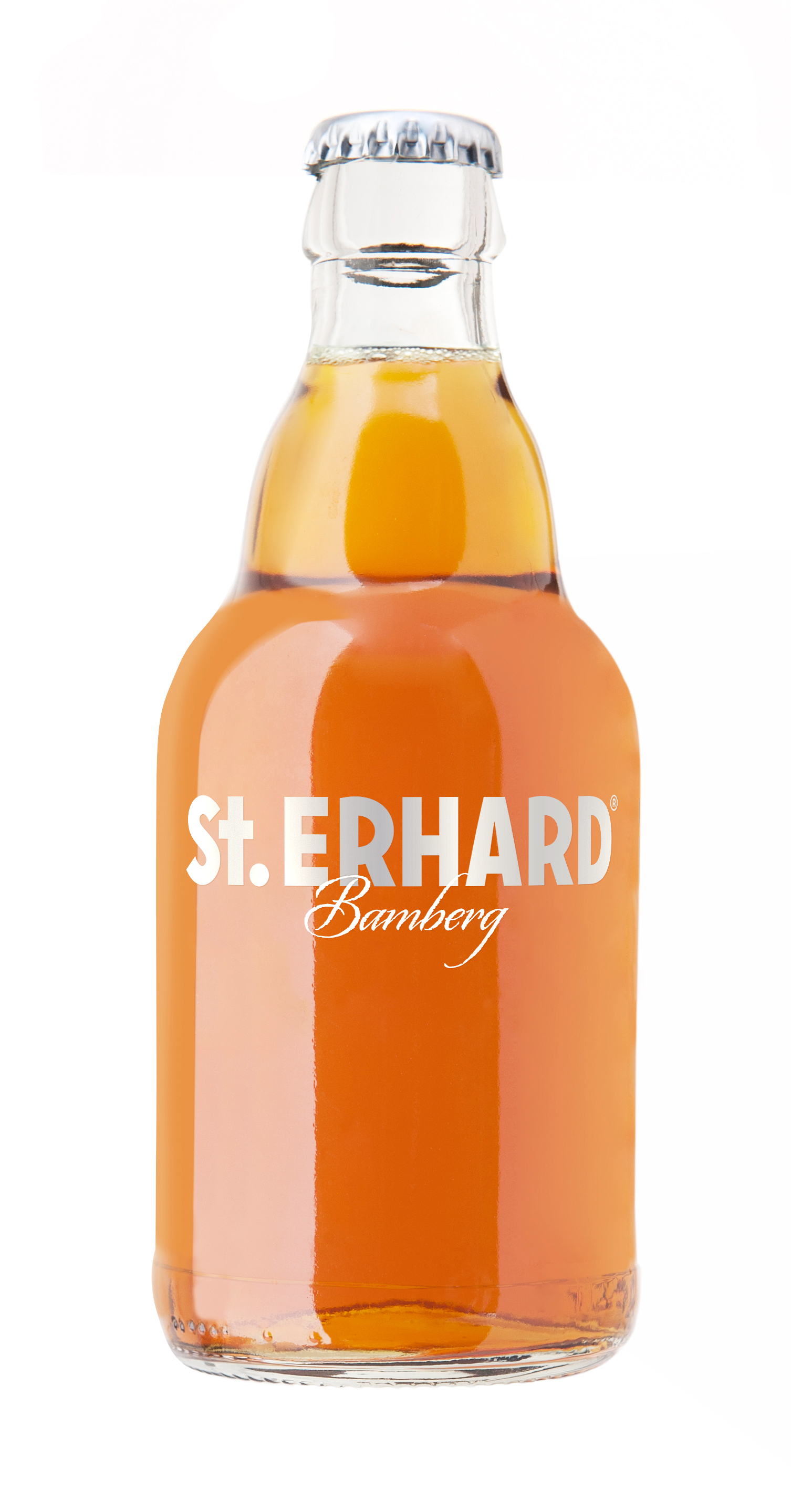
St. ERHARD Bottle

St. Erhard beer is brewed according to the Reinheitsgebot (German purity law) of 1516 and has an original gravity of 12.5 degrees Plato with an alcohol content of 5% by volume. The beer can mainly be found in the Indian market.

== Branding ==
The brand positions itself as a premium product. Unlike most other beer brands St. Erhard comes in a clear glass bottle which has a label printed on the glass and a varnished UV protection.

== Trademark ==
The brand name 'St. ERHARD' is an internationally registered trademark for beer and related products and services.

== International locations ==
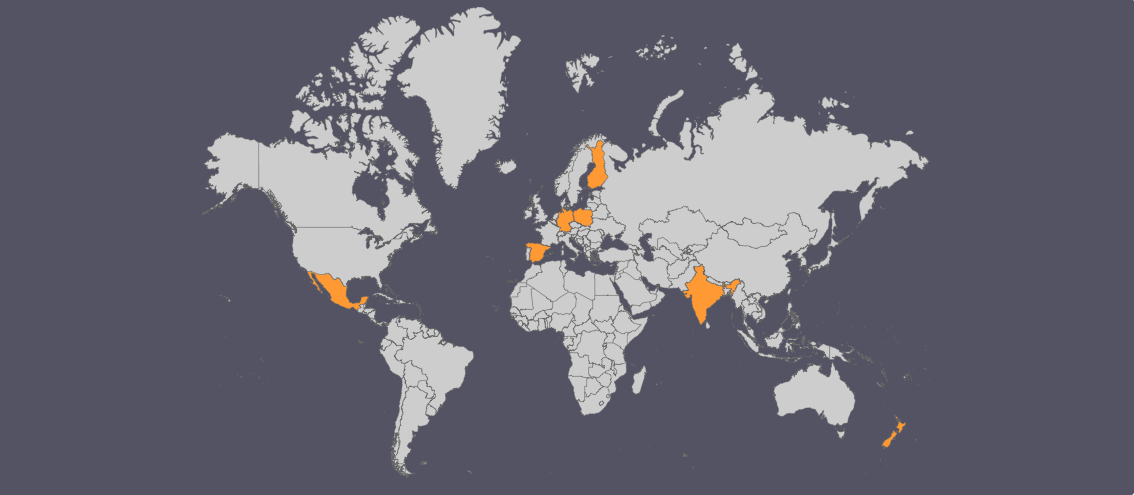
Legend Countries where St. ERHARD can be found
