= Erhardt Jensen =

Danish footballer (1887-1944)

Personal information
- Date of birth: 30 October 1887
- Date of death: 14 September 1944 (aged 56)

International career
Years	Team	Apps	(Gls)
1918	Denmark	1	(0)

Erhardt Jensen (30 October 1887 – 14 September 1944) was a Danish footballer. He played in one match for the Denmark national football team in 1918.
