= Erhard Altdorfer =

German artist (c. 1480 – 1561)

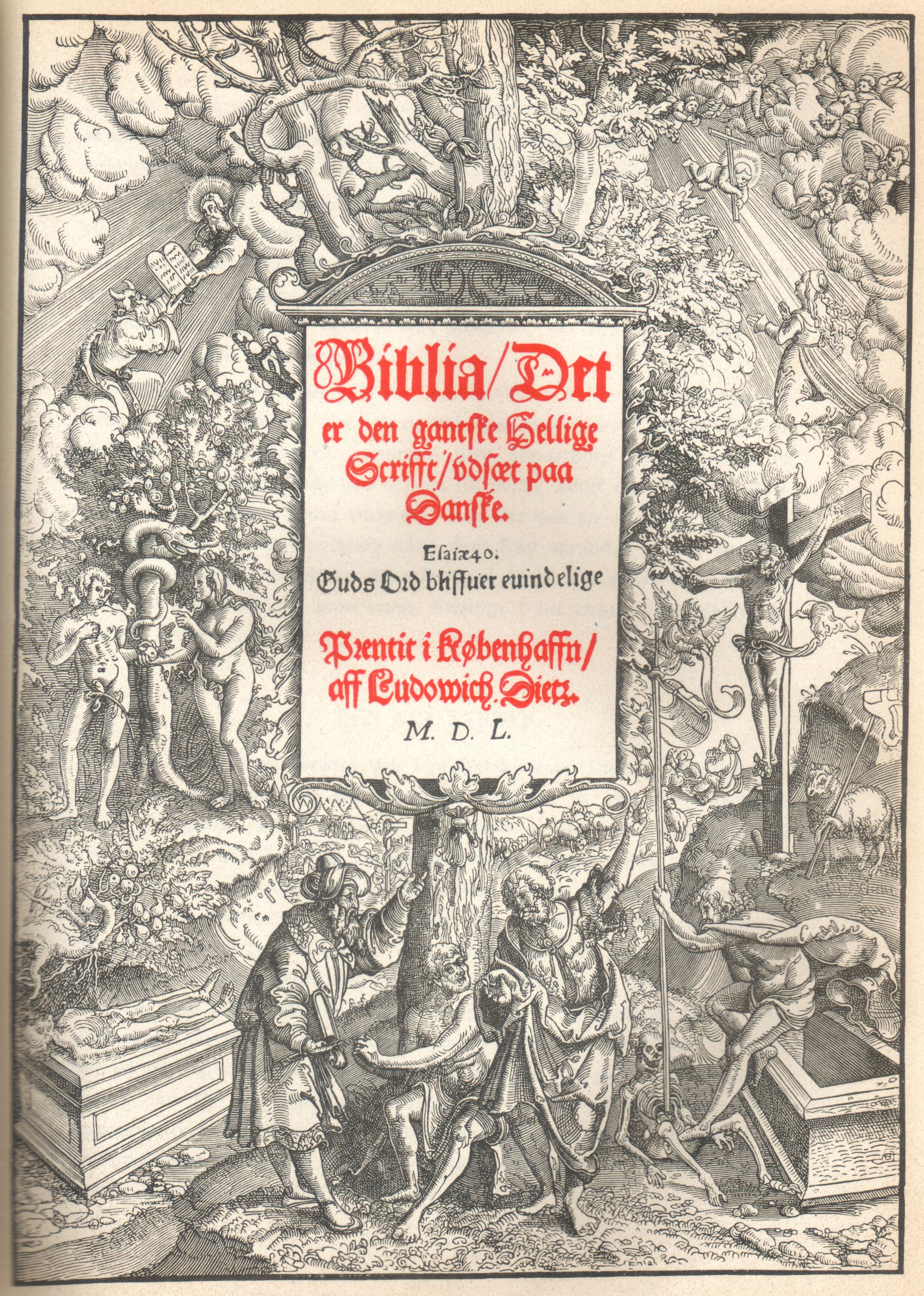
Bible of Christian III

Erhard Altdorfer (sometimes spelled Erhart Aldorfer; c. 1480 – 1561) was a German Early Renaissance printmaker, painter, and architect, who worked as a court painter in Schwerin from 1512 until his death in 1561.

Erhard Altdorfer was the younger brother of Albrecht Altdorfer. Most likely, he was trained by his brother, and it is believed they started a workshop together in 1506.

It is assumed Erhard Altdorfer worked in Austria at the Lambach Abbey, and in St Florian and Klosterneuburg around 1510. In 1512, he went to Schwerin, where Duke Henry V of Mecklenburg-Schwerin (1479–1552) appointed him court painter and architect. During a trip with the duke that year, he probably came in contact with Lucas Cranach the Elder. A commission for the duke and Albert VII was an altarpiece in Sternberg, however, destroyed by fire in 1741.

In 1533–34 his woodcuts appeared in Johannes Bugenhagen's Low German translation of the Bible printed in Lübeck by the printer and bookmaker Ludwig Dietz (–1559), a work for which he was rewarded with a house. Between 1546 and 1551, further construction projects were realized, projects of which remains virtually no traces, why one can have only vague ideas of their character.

In 1552, the written records of John Albert I of Mecklenburg (1525–1576) tells us Erhard Altdorfer was working for him, and until 1555 Erhard probably worked as the leading architect of the court of Wismar. He is mentioned a last time in 1561.

Of his surviving works, most are those he produced as a painter, and at least parts of the altar pieces in the collection of the St. Annen Museum in Lübeck are attributed to him.

Compared to his brothers, Erhard was less independent and creative in his work, and took a lot of influence from the working practice of the workshop of Cranach and from artists such as Jacopo de' Barbari. As it seems, he was primarily as a draughtsman and a printmaker and only produced a few paintings. However, he only signed a few of his works, so most of those associated with him are only attributed works.

== See also ==
- German Renaissance
