= Grotesque (Stephenson Blake typefaces) =

Family of sans-serif typefaces

- Category: Sans-serif
- Classification: Grotesque
- Foundry: Stephenson Blake
- Date created: 1906–1949

The Stephenson Blake Grotesque fonts are a series of sans-serif typefaces created by the type foundry Stephenson Blake of Sheffield, England, mostly around the beginning of the twentieth century.

Stephenson Blake's grotesque faces are in the traditional nineteenth-century "grotesque" style of sans-serif, with folded-up letterforms and a solid structure not intended for extended body text. Forming a sprawling series, they include several unusual details, such as an 'r' with a droop, a bruised-looking 'G' and 'C' with inward curls on the right, very short descenders and considerable variation in stroke width, creating a somewhat eccentric, irregular impression.

Much less even in colour than later families like Univers and Helvetica, they were very commonly used in British commercial printing in the metal type era, with a revival of interest as part of a resurgence of use of such "industrial" sans-serifs around the 1950s. Writing in The Typography of Press Advertisement (1956), printer Kenneth Day commented that the family "has a personality sometimes lacking in the condensed forms of the contemporary sans cuttings of the last thirty years." Jeremy Tankard has described them as the "most idiosyncratic of designs". Not all versions have been digitised.

== Family ==
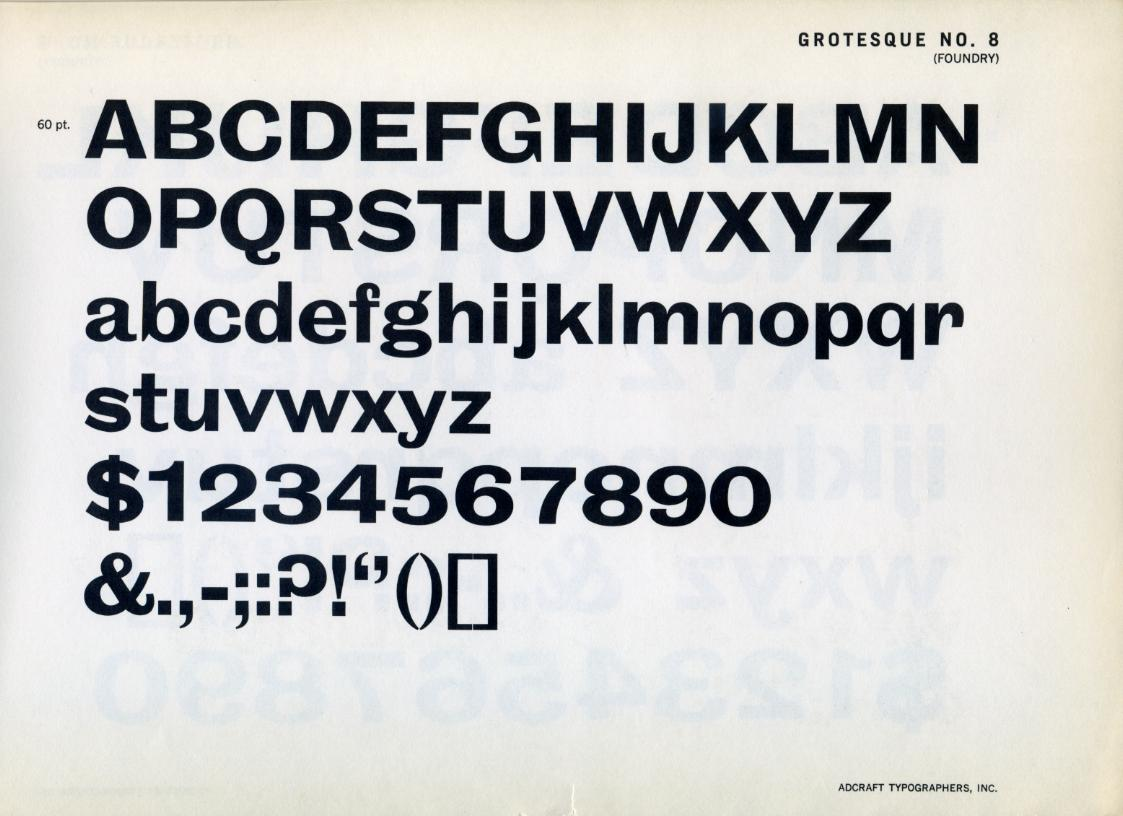
Grotesque No. 8 on a metal type specimen sheet

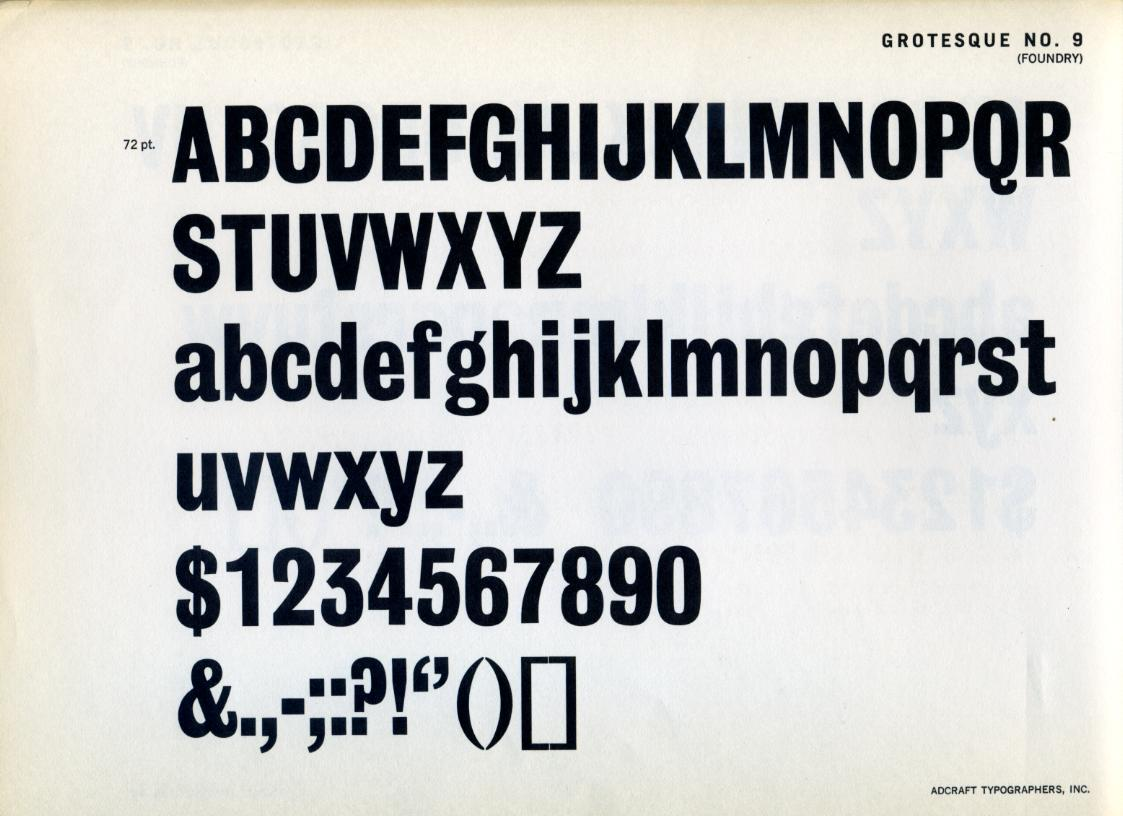
Grotesque No. 9 on a metal type specimen sheet

The family of typefaces was sold by number rather than using weight names. Commonly used numbers included:

- Grotesque No. 5 – condensed
- Grotesque No. 6 – wide
- Grotesque No. 7 – (shown on specimen, above) light condensed
- Grotesque No. 8 – wide, bold.
- Grotesque No. 9 – (shown on specimen, above) condensed, bold. Dated to 1906 by Hutchings, it was particularly popular and an oblique was later added in 1949. It has been digitised.
- Grotesque No. 10 – regular weight and width.
- Grotesque No. 66 – wide

Stephenson Blake also used the terms "Condensed" and "Elongated Sans Serif" in some cases.

A particularly popular member of the family is Grotesque No. 9, a bold condensed weight, and its companion oblique. Early users of "Grot No. 9" include Wyndham Lewis's 1914 avant-garde magazine Blast. It returned to popularity from the 1940s, and an oblique was added in 1949. Colin Banks' 1986 obituary of compositor and advertising designer Bill Morgan credits him and business partner Leon French with the face's revival: "Morgan and French had met doing Ministry of Information propaganda at the London Press Exchange. They had bullied and paid Stephenson Blake, the typefounders, to recall Grot no 9 from historic retirement as they had perceived it as the most economical and powerful letter to exploit the wartime restriction on advertising space." Other designers who liked it included Allen Hutt, who described it in Newspaper Design (1960) as "the best of all Medium Sans, the famous Grotesque No. 9". Grotesque No. 9 reached phototypesetting and Letraset dry transfer lettering and, unlike many of the other Stephenson Blake Grotesques, has been digitised in several releases.

In the United States Roger Black, a prominent publication designer, discovered it in 1972 from a Visual Graphics Corporation phototypesetting catalogue, and came to like it. He used it for designing Newsweek, commissioning a bolder custom redesign from Jim Parkinson. Font Bureau, the digital typeface design studio he co-founded in 1989, also issued Bureau Grotesque, an adaptation of the whole Grotesque family with a large range of styles, co-designed by the company's other co-founder David Berlow. Other users have included Q magazine.

The Stephenson Blake Grotesques should not be confused with the first sans-serif font ever made, the capitals-only Caslon Egyptian of c. 1816 which Stephenson Blake sold, which was a quite separate design.

== Related fonts ==
The first section of Wyndham Lewis' Manifesto, Blast 1, 1914, in Grotesque No. 9

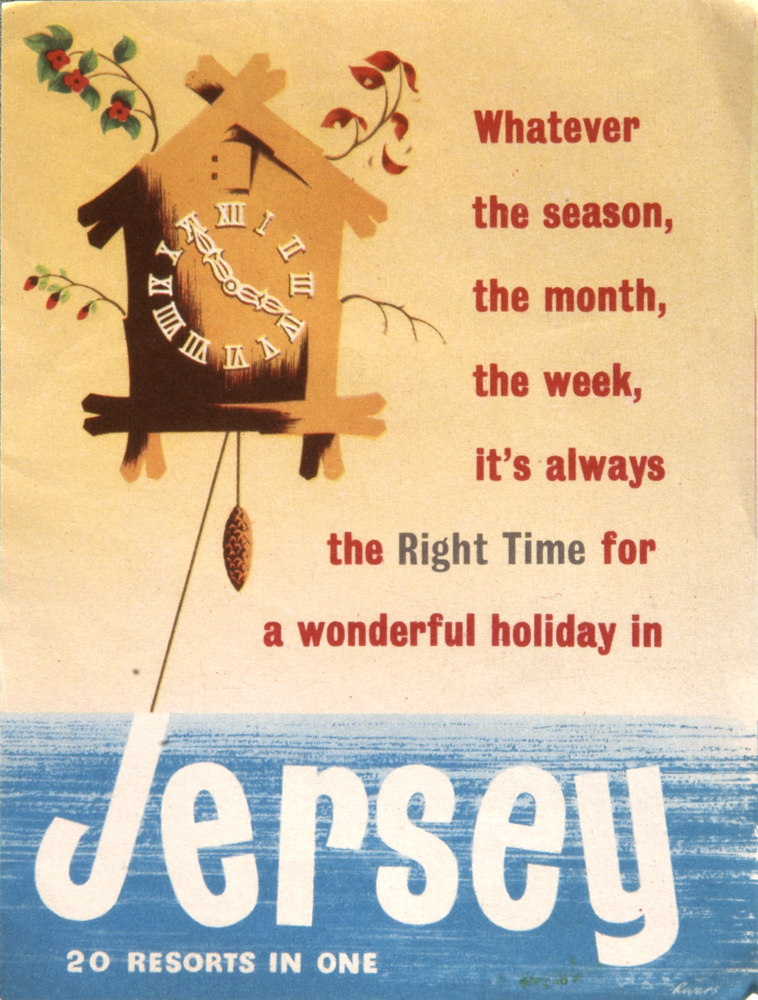
Grotesque No. 9 on a poster for Jersey

Similar designs include in the metal type period:

- Miller and Richard's similar grotesque family
- Monotype Grotesque–another large family of trade sans-serifs from the British Monotype Corporation
- Headline Bold or Series 595, Monotype's clone of No. 9 with oblique, upright weight digitised.
- The Caslon Type Foundry's Doric family and other related sans-serifs, although these lack some of the Stephenson Blake family's quirkier details

Digital period:

- "Bureau Grotesque" family from Font Bureau, a loose digital adaptation.
- Balboa by Jim Parkinson with vertical sides on the capitals and a shaded weight, inspired by his design for Newsweek but also by a wood type used by the San Francisco Chronicle, and his related design ITC Roswell.
- Kilburn by Adrian Talbot, a digital family inspired by the condensed styles.
- Sporting Grotesque, a wide open-source family by Lucas Le Bihan loosely inspired by Grotesque No. 6.
- Work Sans by Wei Huang, loosely based on Grotesque No. 10 and other wider sans-serifs from the period, adapted for onscreen display.
- Caslon Doric, a digital adaptation of the Caslon Foundry sans-serifs by Paul Barnes and Tim Ripper at Commercial Type

The modern corporate font of Sheffield, Wayfarer designed by Jeremy Tankard, is designed with some influences of the Stephenson Blake Grotesque series but predominantly based on their unrelated sans-serif Granby.
