= Stephenson Blake =

English engineering company

- Stephenson Blake's letterhead logo in 1950
- Industry: Type foundry
- Founded: July 1818
- Founder: William Garnett, John Stephenson, James Blake
- Headquarters: Sheffield, England

Stephenson Blake is an engineering company based in Sheffield, England. The company was active from the early 19th century as a type founder, remaining until the 1990s as the last active type foundry in Britain, since when it has diversified into specialist engineering.

The type foundry began operations in July 1818 by silversmith and mechanic William Garnett and toolmaker John Stephenson, financially supported by James Blake. That November, news came that the breakaway Caslon foundry (formed when William Caslon III left the original firm and acquired Joseph Jackson's foundry in 1792§ (Caslon foundry 1716; 1764; etc. §) was put up for sale by William Caslon IV. In 1819 the deal was concluded and Blake, Garnett & Co. were suddenly in charge of one of England's most prestigious typefoundries. In 1829 Garnett left to become a farmer. The company was renamed Blake & Stephenson in 1830, but Blake died soon after. It became Stephenson, Blake & Co. in 1841-1905. John Stephenson died in 1864, the year after he handed control to his son Henry. In 1905 the firm purchased Sir Charles Reed and Sons Ltd. It was then known as Stephenson, Blake & Co., and Sir Charles Reed and Sons between 1905-1914. In 1914, without any change in proprietorship, the business was converted into a private limited liability company. In the early 1900s, the foundry had ventured into steel making and tool production, which would prove to be the core business of the current firm Stephenson, Blake and Co., Ltd. from 1914 until 2004 when Tom Blake (5th Generation) retired.

== Mergers and acquisitions ==
- Fann Street Foundry (1906)
- Fry's Type Street Letter Foundry via merger of Sir Charles Reed & Sons in 1905. Sir Charles Reed & Sons historically purchased Edmund Fry & Son in 1828 via the William Thorowgood Foundry 'Letter Foundry to His Majesty' which changed the Company name three times: Thorowgood and Besley 1838-1849; Robert Besley & Co 1849-1861; till it was Reed & Fox in 1861-1877.
- H.W. Caslon & Sons (1937)

The foundry also acquired some materials from Miller & Richard when it was wound up in 1952.

== Dissolution ==
While the foundry was still producing some type in zinc as late as 2001, the foundry had shut down by 2005 when the matrices and other typographic equipment, by then of little commercial value (but of great historical value), were passed to the Monotype Corporation, becoming a key part of the Type Museum, London. The Heritage Lottery Fund funded the work at the suggestion of Susan Shaw in 1996 so that the machinery and equipment of Stephenson Blake (and Robert DeLittle of York) could be loaded up and sent to South London.

== Typefaces ==
The foundry types produced by Stephenson Blake fall into three categories: those designed in-house, those designed by firms subsequently merged into Stephenson Blake, and those designs licensed from other foundries.

=== Original designs ===
- Algerian (1908)
- Athenian (1889, William Kirkwood)
- Antique Nos. 1 + 2 + 3 + 4 (1904, William Kirkwood)
- Arabian (1904)
- Britannic (1906), derived from Rothbury.
- Chatsworth (1921)
- Chisel (1935, Robert Harling), also sold by Enschedé as Bavo.
- Consort (1956), a re-issue of the original Clarendon, with new weights added.
- Coronation (1937), a knock-off of Corvinus.
- Dominus (1925), also known as Clearface Open and Handtooled
- Elongated Roman (1955), a revival of a nineteenth-century face.
- Ganton (1927)
- Granby (1930 onwards), a humanist sans-serif influenced by Gill Sans and Johnston
- Grotesque series - a large family of sans-serifs sold by number
- Impact by Geoffrey Lee (1965)
- June (1927)
- Latin Wide (1940), digitised and offered with Microsoft Office
- Keyboard (1951, Robert Harling)
- Kingston (1924)
- Playbill (1938, Robert Harling), an updating of a nineteenth-century French Clarendon face.
- Podium (1927), later digitized as Podium Sharp by Mateusz Machalski.
- Revue (1968, Colin Brignall)
- Windsor (1905, Elisha Pechey), punches by William Kirkwood.

=== Designs of predecessor corporations ===
- Alexandra (SB 1911), from matrices acquired from the Reed Foundry.
- Ancient Black (1582, SB 1904) from original matrices acquired by the Reed Foundry. Originally English No. 2 from the stock of Wolf, a London printer, passed to John James Foundry, then to Fry.
- Baskerville (1795, SB 1906, Isaac Morre) from original matrices acquired by the Reed Foundry from the Fry Foundry.
- Caslon Egyptian - the first commercial sans-serif typeface, created by the Caslon foundry. Inherited as a single-size font, later with increased popularity of the style other sizes cut. Caps-only.
- Clarendon (1845), cast by R. Besley & Co. (Fann Street Foundry), subsequently re-issued as Consort.
- Doric 12 (1816, SB 1870), originally cast by the Caslon foundry.
- Fry's Canon (1808, Fry Foundry), privately case for use by Kynoch Press and Curwen Press.
- Fry's Ornamented (1796, SB 1907, Richard Austin), from matrices acquired by the Reed Foundry from the Fry Foundry.
- Georgian (c. 1790, SB 1909), perhaps from matrices acquired from the Fry Foundry.

=== Licensed designs ===
- Abbey Text (SB 1919), a knock-off of Bradley Text by A.D. Farmer & Son.
- Adonis (1961, André Cretton), originally produced for photocomposition by the Amsterdam Type foundry.
- Albion (1910, SB 1919), originally made for machine composition by Lanston Monotype.
- Amanda (1939), also known as Amanda Ronde, an outside design originally known as Undine Ronde.
- Antique Old Style No. 2 (SB 1869), purchased from Aubert Freres, Paris.
- Art and Craft, perhaps Robert Wiebking's Artcraft?
- Bologna (1946), originally cast by ATF.
- Doric 1 Italic (1892, John Hambur), from a foundry in Hamburg, Germany.
- Doric 12 (1816), originally cast by Caslon foundry
- Egyptian Expanded (1950), originally cast by Miller & Richardson
- Goudy Modern (1918, SB 1929, Frederic Goudy), originally made for machine composition by Lanston Monotype.
- Klang (1955, Will Carter), originally made for machine composition by Monotype, SB later added a bold.
- Madonna Ronde (1925, Lucian Bernhard) a re-casting of Bauer's Bernhard Cursive.
- Mazarin (1921, Robert Girard), a re-casting of Deberny & Peignot's Astree
- Mercury Script (1936, SB 1950, Erich Mollowitz), acquired from Stevens, Shanks, originally cast by Trennert as Rheingold. Also copied by Weber Typefoundry as Forelle.
- Spartan, a knock-off of Copperplate Gothic, originally cast by Western Type Foundry.

== Successor corporation ==
Stephenson & Blake is now a company which specializes in toolmaking, parts manufacturer, and CNC machining.

Their in-house machining/engineering department make tooling for any kind of plastic welding, and because of the CNC machining department, can make dies which are impossible to make out of tooling rule.

In December 2007, Stephenson & Blake acquired Nu-Gauge engineering, who are a major manufacturer to the glass gauge industry in the United Kingdom. Nu-Gauge engineering has been merged to within Stephenson & Blake, and will make any type of gauge to order with extremely tight tolerances.

In December 2009, Stephenson & Blake acquired the steel rule tooling business from DR Tooling Ltd; They now design and manufacture steel cutting tools alongside their High Frequency Welding tools.

In 2010 Stephenson & Blake acquired the Brass Welding/High Frequency Welding rule business from Caslon. Stephenson & Blake now manufacture the whole of Caslon's High Frequency Welding Rule range alongside their own inventory.

== Use within Sheffield ==
Until 2023, the University of Sheffield used two fonts "TUOS Stephenson" (serif, originally designed by S&B) and "TUOS Blake" (sans serif) as part of their corporate identity.

Sheffield City Council uses a corporate font, Wayfarer, commissioned from designer Jeremy Tankard that is based on Stephenson Blake's sans-serif Granby and Grotesque No. 9 families.
