= Caslon Egyptian =

Typeface

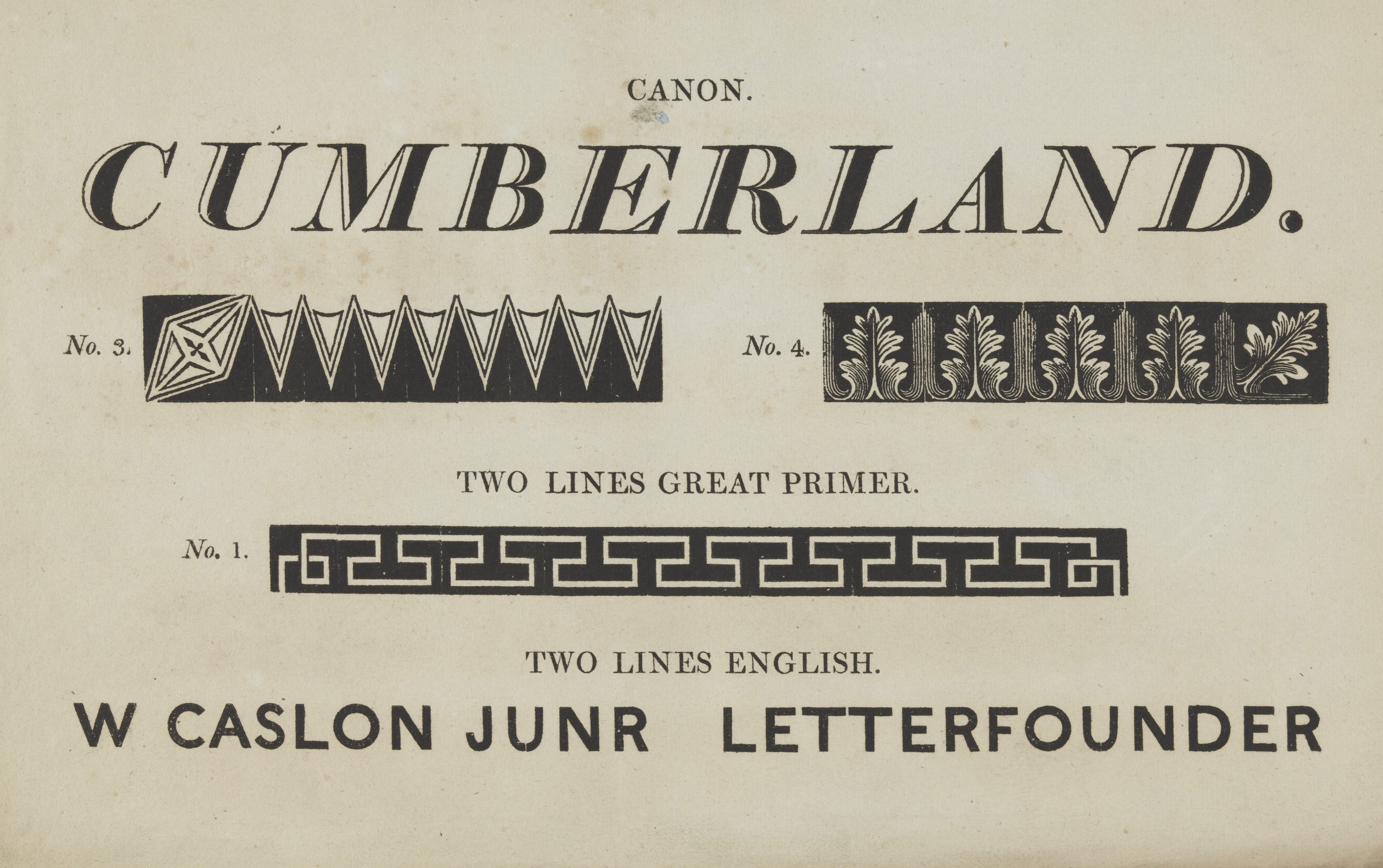
Caslon Two Lines English Egyptian in an early specimen book

Egyptian is a typeface created by the Caslon foundry of Salisbury Square, London around or probably slightly before 1816, that is the first general-purpose sans-serif typeface in the Latin alphabet known to have been created. (Note: Though not the very first. Printing types had already been made in a sans-serif style for ancient Greek and Etruscan, and by Valentin Haüy for embossing letters to be read by the blind.)

== Historical background ==
Sans-serif lettering in block capitals had been developing in popularity over the past decades, initially due to interest in classical antiquity in which inscriptions often had minimal or no serifs, and come to be used by architect John Soane and copied by others, particularly in signpainting. Historian James Mosley, the leading expert on early sans-serifs, has suggested in his book The Nymph and The Grot that Soane's influence was crucial in spreading the idea of sans-serif letterforms around the end of the eighteenth century. However, it was some decades before a printing typeface would be released in this style, now commonly used. The name "Egyptian" had become commonly used in England by 1816 to describe this style of lettering; for example on September 13, 1805, the painter Joseph Farington described in his diary the memorial to Isaac Hawkins Browne in the chapel of Trinity College, Cambridge (still extant) as engraved" in what is called Egyptian Characters".

The name "Egyptian" may originate from the image of sans-serifs being historical in style, the Egyptomania of the period and the "blocky" nature of ancient Egyptian architecture. (The term "Egyptian" has since become associated with slab-serif typefaces.)

== Release ==
The "Egyptian" typeface was released by the Caslon type foundry of Salisbury Square, London, run by William Caslon IV. (This was not the Caslon foundry set up in the eighteenth century by William Caslon I: William Caslon III had left his family's business, buying up the type foundry set up by Joseph Jackson, a former apprentice of William Caslon II, and his son William Caslon IV had then succeeded to running this foundry.) It is somewhat "classical" in style, being capitals-only, formal in design and not particularly bold (although still bolder than conventional body text fonts), appearing similar to Soane's lettering. The matrices (moulds used to cast the letters) survive in the collection of the Type Museum, London, with some replacement letters. "Egyptian" is the only part of its name referring to its design: the first part of its name in specimen books, Two Lines English, is simply the standard name used at the time for its size, around 28 modern points. Typeface names at this point had not emerged: types at the time generally were just listed by their size, or numbered.

Caslon's Egyptian typeface was shown in the foundry's specimen books, the earliest edition with a date dated 1816 although some possibly earlier. (Note: Historian John A. Lane, who has examined surviving Caslon specimens, suggests that the design is actually slightly earlier and may date to around 1812-4, noting that it appears in some undated but apparently earlier specimens. The matrices also were first used in unsuccessful attempts to punch out different fonts, which also may date to some years before 1816.) It appears sandwiched by larger and much more ornate typefaces, apparently not marketed with any prominence. Aside from its documented existence and survival, the reasons behind its creation are not clear, especially since no contemporary uses of it have been found. Mosley suggests that it may have been created on commission by a specific client.

The matrices of the Caslon sans-serif were acquired by the Stephenson Blake company when it took over the Salisbury Square Caslon company. Sans-serifs returned to printing when Vincent Figgins' foundry started to issue a new series of sans-serifs starting around 1828, so the company started offering the type for sale in their specimens again. (These should not be confused with Stephenson Blake's unrelated "Grotesque" typefaces of the late nineteenth century.)

== Digitisations ==
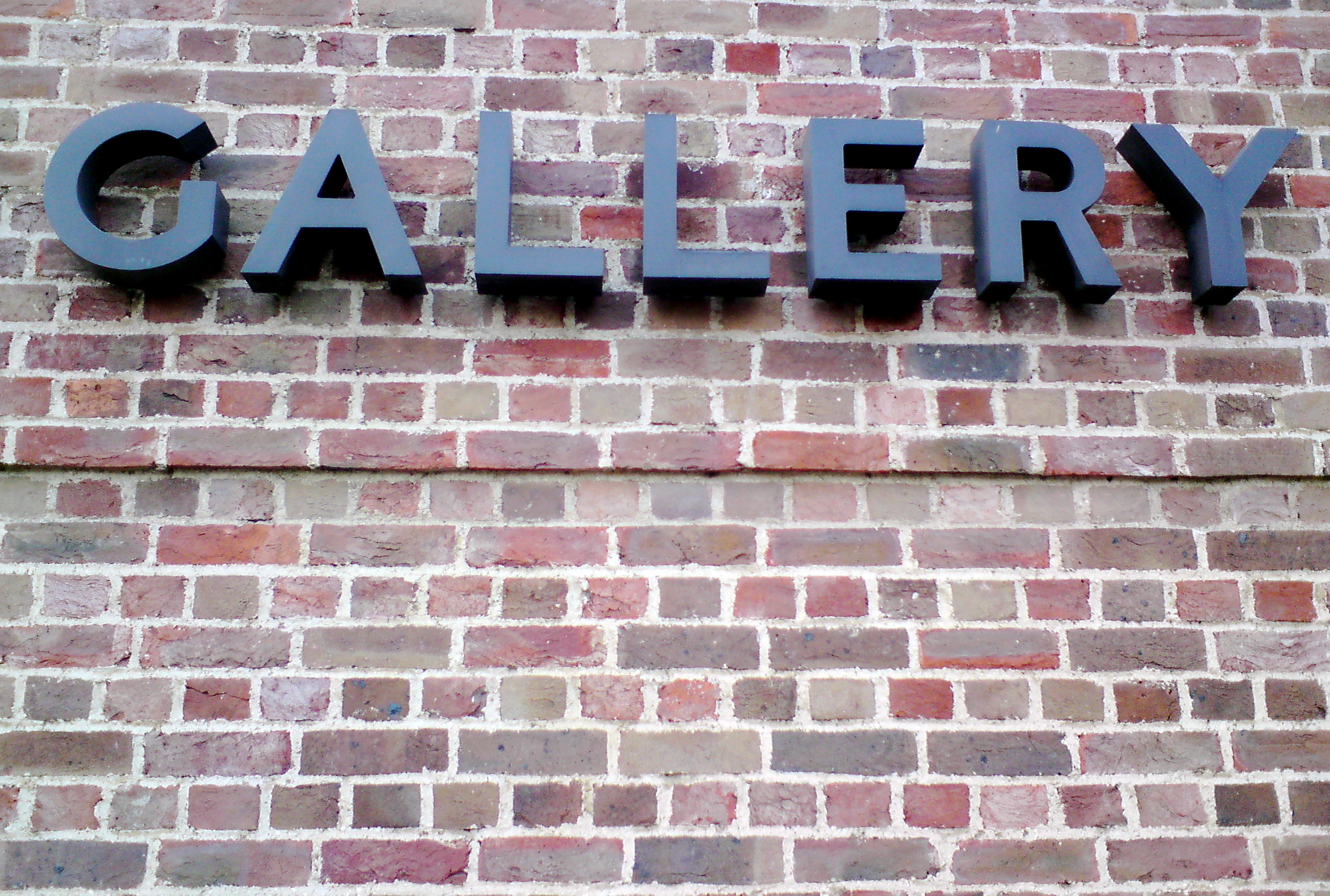
Signage in a Caslon Egyptian revival at Dulwich Picture Gallery. The 'G' in the original typeface had a spur at bottom right down to the baseline.

Several digital revivals of Caslon's Egyptian have been made, for commercial use by Miko McGinty, Cyrus Highsmith and Christian Schwartz of Font Bureau (adding a lower case invented by Schwartz) and for private use by Justin Howes and by James Mosley, both with a modified G. Howes' revival is used for signage at Dulwich Picture Gallery, designed by Soane. In 1987 metal type was cast by Oxford University Press from the original matrices to print a special edition of reprinted type from the early nineteenth century crafted by Ian Mortimer.

To mark the two-hundredth anniversary of the first dated printing of a sans-serif typeface, a conference was held at Birmingham City University in September 2016.
