= Algerian (typeface) =

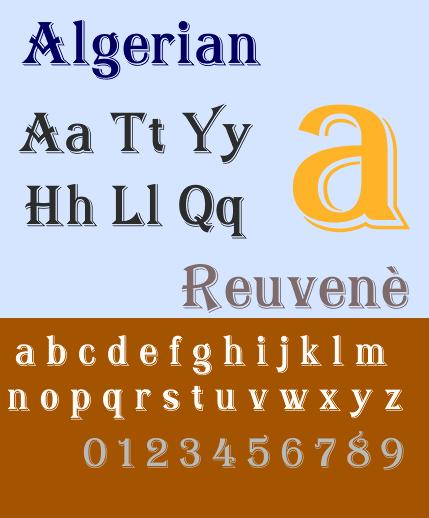
- Category: Serif / Display
- Classification: Decorative
- Foundry: Stephenson, Blake & Co.
- Date released: c. 1902
- Re-issuing foundries: Scangraphic; Linotype; URW Type Foundry; FontMesa
- Variations: Algerian Condensed; Algerian Mesa; Tavern; Bay Tavern; Bayside Tavern; Taco; Algerian Rnd
- Also known as: Gloria
- Shown here: Algerian Mesa

Algerian is a decorative serif font family originally produced in the early 20th century by British foundry Stephenson, Blake & Co. The design for the typeface is owned by Linotype, while the name is a trademark of the International Typeface Corporation.

Algerian appears in the Stephenson, Blake & Co. 1907 type specimen book on page 142, with the Algerian font as used today as the small caps lowercase to a more decorative uppercase set of initials. The solid black version of Algerian appears on the same page under the name of Gloria, with a separate shadow layer face available.

Algerian (regular) was created for Scangraphic at Letraset. Algerian Condensed was created by the Linotype library designer Alan Meeks.

URW's version of the Algerian font was one of the default fonts supplied with Microsoft Office from 1993 onwards, and has been characterised as an overused font.

Originally, the Algerian font only had capital letters, but in 2005, Michael Hagemann of FontMesa added lowercase letters to produce Algerian Mesa.

In 2017, Hagemann expanded the Algerian font family to 144 styles, introducing new bold, light, outline and open faced weights including italics. This new version was released by FontMesa under the name of Tavern.

In March 2020, FontMesa released two more weights of the Algerian font, under the name of Tavern; extra bold and black weights were also created, making Algerian a five-weight font family with 192 styles. Also in March 2020, FontMesa released a weathered, rough-edged version of Algerian under the name Bay Tavern, with an alternate version called Bayside Tavern; together they added another 144 font styles to the Algerian family.

Algerian has been most notably used as the typeface in the logo of Patrón tequila since 1989.

In September 2020, FontMesa released a Mexican-style version of Algerian under the name Taco, which is a multi-layered font family including 20 styles.

In December 2023, Hagemann created a rounded edge version of Algerian, released under the name Algerian Rnd; this greatly expanded the usability of the original design.

== Usage ==
- The logotype for the final season of Walker, Texas Ranger.
