= Pantographia =

1799 work on writing systems and typography by Edmund Fry

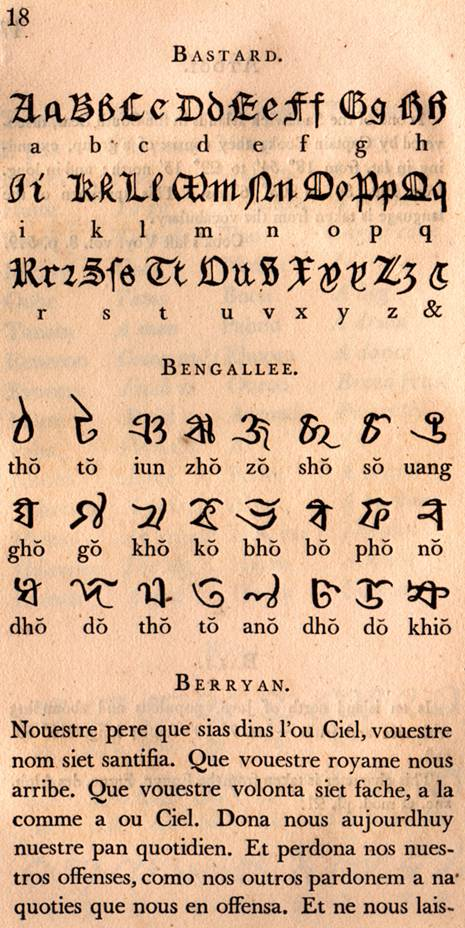
Bastarda and Bengali print in Fry's Pantographia

Pantographia, with the full title being Pantographia; containing accurate copies of all the known alphabets in the world; together with an English explanation of the peculiar force or power of each letter, is the title of a 1799 work on writing systems and typography by Edmund Fry, one of the most learned of the English typefounders of his day.

Fry provided a description of each alphabet on the right-handed pages with a specimen of the full range of the alphabet on the left. Fry spent sixteen years researching the book, which contains more than 200 specimens, with writing systems from Abyssinia to New Zealand, including 20 varieties of Chaldean, 39 of the Greek, 8 Egyptian, 11 Hebrew, 7 Irish, 6 Malayan, 7 Arabic, 7 Phoenician, 7 Samaritan, one Tibetan, and 2 Welsh.

Extant copies of Fry's Pantographia are exceedingly rare but at least one sound specimen is preserved in the collection of the American Antiquarian Society.
