= Edward Rowe Mores =

British scholar and actuary (1731–1778)

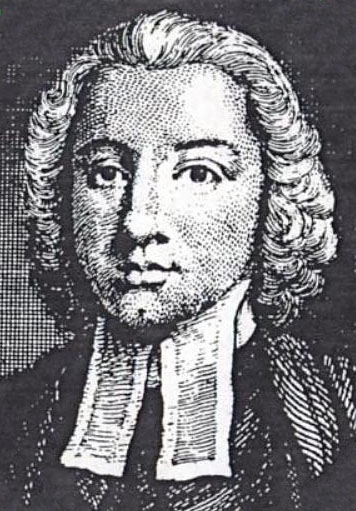
Edward Rowe Mores (1731–1778)

Edward Rowe Mores, FSA (/ˈmɒrɪs/; 24 January 1731 [OS: 13 January 1730] – 22 November 1778) was an English antiquarian and scholar, who wrote works on history and typography. He was also instrumental in the founding of The Society for Equitable Assurances on Lives and Survivorships (now commonly known as Equitable Life), and is credited with being the first person to use the professional title actuary in relation to insurance.

== Early life and education ==
Edward Rowe Mores was born on 24 January 1731 [NS] at Gore Court in Tunstall near Sittingbourne in Kent. His father Edward Mores (1681–1740) was a member of the gentry, and had been rector of Tunstall for twenty years. His mother was Sarah Windsor, the daughter of a City merchant. He had one sister, Ann-Catherine.

In 1740, Mores's father died leaving a considerable inheritance, and later the same year he entered the Merchant Taylors' School in London. His mother soon remarried, to Richard Bridgman, a grocer of Whitechapel, London, who was of increasing importance in the Grocers' Company. Mores entered Queen's College, Oxford in 1746, obtaining a BA in 1750, and MA in 1753.

== Antiquarianism ==
At Oxford, he was renowned for the range and depth of his learning and for his idiosyncrasies. He studied Latin, and spoke it almost exclusively to his daughter when she was young. Besides mathematics, he was interested in such diverse studies as heraldry and architecture. He was elected a fellow of the Society of Antiquaries in 1752, and the following year was elected a member of the society's council.

He published his first work, Nomina et insignia gentilitia nobilium equitumque sub Edoardo primo rege militantium (a study of the heraldry of the knights of Edward I), in 1749, at the age of 19 and when he was still at Oxford. He spent some years working on a projected county history of Berkshire: it remained unfinished, but the manuscript was eventually published posthumously in 1783 by Richard Gough as Collections toward a Parochial History of Berkshire. In 1754–55 he assisted his friend Andrew Ducarel (who had limited eyesight) in compiling a manuscript history of Croydon Palace and the town of Croydon for presentation to Thomas Herring, Archbishop of Canterbury: however, the work led to a virulent rift between the two when Mores discovered that he was not given due credit on the title page. This work was eventually also published in 1783.

== The Equitable Society ==
After James Dodson's death, Mores became the leader of the group which eventually became the Society for Equitable Assurances on Lives and Survivorship in 1762. He specified that the chief official should be called the actuary, which is the earliest known reference to the position as a business concern.

== Personal life and death ==
Mores married Susannah Bridgman (1730–1767) in 1753. She was the daughter of Richard Bridgman, Mores's stepfather. The couple had two children: a daughter, Sarah, who predeceased her father; and a son, Edward Rowe (1757 - 1846) who was an active magistrate, and deputy Lieutenant for the counties of Middlesex and Essex. Mores, who believed firmly in the superiority of Latin, spoke exclusively in Latin to his children.

Mores died on 28 November 1778 at Etlow House, Low Leyton, Essex, of a "mortification" of the leg (i.e. gangrene). He was buried with his wife (who had died eleven years earlier) in the churchyard of St Mary the Virgin, Walthamstow.
