= Edmund Fry =

English type-founder (1754–1835)

- Born: 1754; Bristol, England
- Died: 25 December 1835; London, England
- Known for: Type-founder and chocolate maker

Edmund Fry (1754–1835) was an English type-founder.

== Early life ==
Fry was the son of Joseph Fry, and member of the Bristol Fry family, born at Bristol. He studied medicine; took the degree of M.D. at Edinburgh, and spent some time at St George's Hospital, London.

== Fry & Co. ==
In 1782 his father admitted him and his brother Henry, as partners in the type-foundry business in Queen Street, London. The father retired in 1787, when the new firm, Edmund Fry & Co., issued their first 'Specimen of Printing Types,’ followed the next year by an enlarged edition. Several founts of the oriental type, which fill twelve pages, were cut by Fry.

In 1788 the printing business was separated from the foundry, and remained at Worship Street as the 'Cicero Press,’ under the management of Henry Fry. The foundry was removed to a place opposite Bunhill Fields in Chiswell Street, and new works erected in a street then called Type Street. Homer's series of the classics (1789–1794), printed by Millar Ritchie, were from the characters of the Type Street foundry. In 1793 'Edmund Fry & Co., letter founders to the Prince of Wales,’ produced a 'Specimen of Metal-cast Ornaments curiously adjusted to paper,’ which gained vogue among printers. The next year Fry took Isaac Steele into partnership, and published a 'Specimen' which 'shows a marked advance on its predecessors'.

On the admission of George Knowles in 1799, the firm took the name of Fry, Steele, & Co. At the start of the nineteenth century the modern-faced type supplanted the old-faced. 'Specimens of modern cut printing types from the foundry of Messrs. Fry & Steele' are given in Caleb Stower's 'Printer's Grammar,’ 1808. About this time Fry reassumed sole management of the business. In 1816 a 'Specimen of Printing Types by Edmund Fry, Letter Founder to the King and Prince Regent,’ was published. The firm soon after became Edmund Fry & Son, on the admission of his son, Windover.

In a 'Specimen' printed in 1824 the name is changed back to 'Edmund Fry' at 'the Polyglot Foundry.' In 1828 he moved to dispose of his business, and issued a descriptive circular. It was purchased by William Thorowgood of Fann Street, and the stock removed in 1829. It was then in the hands of Thorowgood & Besley, then R. Besley & Co., and finally Sir Charles Reed & Sons, before closing in the early twentieth century.

== Later life ==
Fry was one of the most learned of the English typefounders, but retired with little. He was a member of the Company of Stationers. He died at Dalby Terrace, City Road, London, at the age of eighty-one, on 22 December 1835.

== Works ==
In 1798 he circulated a 'Prospectus' of the major work on which he had been occupied for sixteen years, published as Pantographia, containing accurate Copies of all the known Alphabets of the World, together with an English explanation of the peculiar Force and Power of each Letter, to which are added Specimens of all well-authenticated Oral Languages, forming a Comprehensive Digest of Phonology, 1799. The volume contains more than two hundred alphabets, including eighteen varieties of the Chaldee and thirty-two of the Greek. Many of the characters were expressly cut by Fry for his book.

Fry cut several founts of oriental types for the university of Cambridge, the British and Foreign Bible Society, and other bodies.

In 1833 twenty designs for raised type for the blind were submitted to the Royal Scottish Society of Arts, who had offered a prize for the best example. Among them was one from Fry, to whom the gold medal was awarded a couple of years after his death.

== Family ==
He was married twice: first to Jenny, daughter of Nicholas Windover, of Stockbridge, Hampshire, of whose issue one son only survived, Windover Fry (1797–1835); secondly to Ann Hancock, by whom he had a son, Arthur (1809–78). A portrait of Fry, painted by Frédérique Boileau, was shown at the Caxton Exhibition in 1877. A silhouette has been reproduced by Reed and Fry.
