= List of American Type Founders typefaces =

American Type Founders was the largest producer of foundry type in the world, not only of in-house designs, but also from designs that came from merged firms. Many of its designs were created or adapted by Morris Fuller Benton, his father Linn, Joseph W. Phinney or Frederic Goudy.

== ATF Designs ==
These foundry types were designed and produced by American Type Founders:

- Abbott Oldstyle (1901, Phinney)
- Adonic (1930, Willard T. Sniffin)
- Adscript (1914, Benton)
- Ad Lib (1961, Freeman Craw)
- Agency Gothic (1933, Benton), later digitized as Agency FB by Font Bureau
  - Agency Gothic Open (1934, Benton)
- Alternate Gothic, Nos. 1,2,3 (1903, Benton)
- American Backslant (1934, Benton)
- American Text (1932, Benton)
- Americana series (1965, Richard Isbell); this was the last face ever cut by ATF.
- Announcement Roman + Italic (1918, Benton)
- Antique Shaded (1914, Benton), cut on a new shading machine invented by Linn Boyd Benton.
- Balloon series (1939, Max R. Kaufmann), originally as Speedball.
  - Balloon Light (Kaufmann)
  - Balloon Bold (Kaufmann)
  - Balloon Extrabold (Kaufmann)
- Bank Gothic series
  - Bank Gothic Light (1930, Benton)
  - Bank Gothic Medium (1932, Benton)
  - Bank Gothic Bold (1932, Benton)
  - Bank Gothic Light Condensed (1933, Benton)
  - Bank Gothic Medium Condensed (1933, Benton)
  - Bank Gothic Bold Condensed (1933, Benton)
- Baron's Boston News Letter (1904, Goudy), a private face cut for Joseph Baron's financial newsletter, matrices cut by Wiebking
- Baskerville Roman + Italic (1915, Benton), after the Fry Foundry version.
- Benton (1934, Benton), designed as Cambridge, released as Benton, reintroduced in 1953 as Whitehall.
- Bernhard Fashion (1929, Lucian Bernhard)
- Bernhard Gothic series (1929, Lucian Bernhard)
  - Bernhard Gothic Light (1929, Bernhard)
  - Bernhard Gothic Medium (1929, Bernhard)
  - Bernhard Gothic Light Italic (1930, Bernhard)
  - Bernhard Gothic Heavy (1930, Bernhard)
  - Bernhard Gothic Extra Heavy (1930, Bernhard)
  - Bernhard Gothic Medium Condensed (1938, Bernhard)
- Bernhard Modern series (1937, Lucian Bernhard)
  - Bernhard Modern Roman + Italic (1937, Bernhard)
  - Bernhard Modern Bold + Italic (1938, Bernhard)
  - Bernhard Modern Condensed (1938, Bernhard)
- Bernhard Tango (1934, Lucian Bernhard)
  - Bernhard Tango Swash Capitals (1939, Bernhard), known in Europe as Aigrette.
- Bodoni series, first American revival of the faces of Giambattista Bodoni.
  - Bodoni (1909, Benton)
  - Bodoni Italic (1910, Benton)
  - Bodoni Book (1910, Benton)
  - Bodoni Book Italic (1911, Benton)
  - Bodoni Bold + Italic (1911, Benton)
  - Bodoni Bold Shaded (1912, Benton)
  - Bodoni Shaded Initials (1914, Benton)
  - Card Bodoni (1915, Benton)
  - Card Bodoni Bold (1917, Benton)
  - Bodoni Open (1918, Benton)
  - Bodoni Book Expanded (1924, Benton)
  - Ultra Bodoni + italic (1928, Benton)
  - Bodoni Bold Condensed (1933, Benton)
  - Ultra Bodoni Condensed + extra condensed (1933, Benton)
  - Engravers Bodoni (1933, Benton), designed in 1926.
- Bold Antique (1904, Benton)
  - Bold Antique Condensed (1908/9 ?, Benton)
- Bologna (1946), also cast by Stephenson Blake.
- Bookman Series
  - Bookman swash letters (1936, Wadsworth A. Parker)
- Bond Script (1905)
- Bradley Text (1895, Phinney), developed from Will H. Bradley's lettering on the Christmas cover of Inland Printer Magazine by either Phinney or Herman Ihlenberg.
- Broadway (1928, Benton), capital letters only.
  - Broadway Condensed (1929, Benton), capitals + lower-case
- Brody (1953, Harold Broderson)
- Brush (1942, Robert E. Smith)
- Bulfinch Oldstyle (1903, Benton), commissioned by the Curtis Publishing Company and prepared by Benton for production from original designs by William Martin Johnson. The “house face” of Ladies’ Home Journal from 1903, offered for general use in 1905.
  - Re-issued as Whittin Black and Whittin Black Condensed (1960, Benton)
- Bulletin Typewriter (1933, Benton)
- Bulmer Roman (1926, Benton), based on a face cut by William Martin for the printer William Bulmer in 1790.
  - Bulmer Roman Italic (1927, Benton)
- Canterbury (1926, Benton)
- Card Roman (1925, Benton)
- Caxton Initials (1905, Goudy), font included twenty-six capitals and one leaf ornament only.
- Century series
  - Century Roman sub-series
    - Century Roman (1894, Linn Boyd Benton)
    - Century Broad Face (c. 1897, Linn Boyd Benton), also known as Century No. 2.
    - Century Expanded (1900, Benton)
    - Century Italic + Century Bold (1905, Benton)
    - Century Bold Condensed (1909, Benton)
    - Century Bold Extended (1910, Benton)
  - Century Oldstyle sub-series
    - Century Oldstyle + italic + bold (1909, Benton)
    - Century Oldstyle Bold Italic (1910, Benton)
    - Century Oldstyle Bold Condensed (1915, Benton)
  - Century Catalog sub-series
    - Century Catalog (1917, Benton)
  - Century Schoolbook sub-series
    - Century Schoolbook (1918, Benton), commissioned by textbook publishers Ginn & Company for maximum legibility.
    - Century Schoolbook Italic (1921, Benton)
    - Century Schoolbook Bold (1923, Benton)
- Cheltenham series
  - Cheltenham (1903, Bertram Goodhue, Ingalls Kimball, Benton and/or Phinney)
  - Cheltenham Bold (1903, Benton)
  - Cheltenham Bold Condensed (1904, Benton)
  - Cheltenham Bold Italic + Cheltenham Bold Condensed Italic + Cheltenham Wide + Cheltenham Bold Outline (1905, Benton)
  - Cheltenham Bold Extra Condensed + Cheltenham Bold Extended (1906, Benton)
  - Cheltenham Inline + Cheltenham Inline Extra Condensed
  - Cheltenham Inline Extended (1907, Benton)
  - Cheltenham Oldstyle Condensed + Cheltenham Medium (1909, Benton)
  - Cheltenham Medium Italic + Cheltenham Extra Bold (1910, Benton)
  - Cheltenham Bold Shaded + Cheltenham Bold Italic Shaded + Cheltenham Extra Bold Shaded (1912, Benton)
  - Cheltenham Medium Condensed + Cheltenham Medium Expanded (1913, Benton)
- Chic (1928, Benton)
- Civilité (1922, Benton), a modern adaptation of Robert Granjon’s face cut in 1557.
- Clearface series, designed with the help of his father, Linn Boyd Benton.
  - Clearface (1907, Benton)
  - Clearface Bold + Italic (Benton)
  - Clearface Heavy + Italic (Benton)
  - Clearface Italic (Benton)
- Clearface Gothic (1910, Benton)
- Cloister series
  - Cloister Old Style (1913, Benton), based on the 1470 Venetian face of Nicolas Jenson.
  - Cloister Italic (1913, Benton), based on the 1501 italic face of Aldus Manutius.
  - Cloister Bold Condensed (1917, Benton)
  - Cloister Initials (1918, Goudy)
  - Cloister Cursive (1922, Benton)
  - Cloister Lightface (1924, Benton)
  - Cloister Lightface Italic (1925, Benton)
  - Cloister Cursive Handtooled (1926, Benton), with Charles H. Becker.
- Cloister Black (1904, Benton), usually credited to Phinney, but many authorities give full credit to Benton. It is an adaptation of Priory Text, an 1870s version of William Caslon's Caslon Text of 1734. Lower-case letters are identical with Phinney's earlier Flemish Black.
- Collier Old Style (1919, Goudy), a private type for Proctor & Collier, a Cincinnati advertising agency, matrices cut by Wiebking.
- Contact (1944, F. H. Riley)
- Commercial Script (1908, Benton)
- Copperplate series A continuation of a series originally cast by Marder, Luse, & Co.
  - Copperplate Gothic Shaded (1912, Benton)
- Craw Clarendon (1955-60, Freeman Craw)
- Craw Modern series
  - Craw Modern (1958, Craw)
  - Craw Modern Italic (1960, Craw)
  - Craw Modern Bold (1963, Craw)
- Cromwell (1913, Benton), uses capital letters from Benton’s Cloister Old Style.
- Cushing (1897, Benton), design suggested by J. Stearns Cushing. (Cushing Antique was a Ludlow face.)
- Della Robbia series
  - Della Robbia (Thomas Maitland Cleland)
  - Della Robbia Light (1913, Benton)
- Devens Script (1898, Phinney)
- Dom series (1950, Peter Dombrezian)
  - Dom Diagonal (1950, Dombrezian)
  - Dom Casual (1951, Dombrezian)
  - Dom Bold (1953, Dombrezian)
- Dynamic Medium (1930, Benton)
- Eagle Bold (1934, Benton), a variant of Novel Gothic, designed for the National Recovery Administration, used on their Blue Eagle posters.
- Elmora (1968)
- Empire (1937, Benton), no lower-case.
- Engravers Bold (1902, also cast by Barnhart Brothers & Spindler, Benton)
- Engravers Old English (1906, Benton), based upon Caslon Text and designed in association with "Cowan" or perhaps Phinney.
  - Engravers Old English Bold (1910, Benton)
- Engravers Shaded (1906, Benton)
  - Lithographic Shaded (1914, Benton + W. F. Capitian), a half-shaded version of Engravers Shaded.
- Engravers Text (1930, Benton)
- Flemish Black (1902, Phinney)
- Franklin Gothic series, the patriarch of American sans-serif faces, named for Benjamin Franklin, America’s greatest printer.
  - Franklin Gothic (1903, Benton)
  - Franklin Gothic Condensed + Extra Condensed (1906, Benton)
  - Franklin Gothic Italic (1910, Benton)
  - Franklin Gothic Condensed Shaded (1912, Benton)
- Freehand (1917, Benton)
- Gallia (1927, Wadsworth A. Parker), some sources attribute this to Benton.
- Garamond series, based upon the designs of 16th-century type founder, Claude Garamond.
  - Garamond (1919, Benton), with T.M. Cleland
  - Garamond Bold (1920, Benton)
  - Garamond Italic (1923, Benton), with T.M. Cleland
  - Garamond Open (1931, Benton)
- Globe Gothic (c. 1900, Benton), a refinement of Taylor Gothic, designed by ATF vice-president Phinney in 1897 for Charles H. Taylor for the exclusive use of the Boston Globe.
  - Globe Gothic Condensed + Extra Condensed + Extended (c. 1900, Benton)
  - Globe Gothic Bold (1907, Benton), credited to Benton, though Goudy claims Phinney commissioned him to do it.
  - Globe Gothic Bold Italic (1908, Benton)
- Goudy Old Style series
  - Goudy Old Style + Italic (1915, Goudy)
  - Goudy Title (1918, Benton)
  - Goudy Bold Italic + Goudy Catalog (1919, Benton)
  - Goudy Catalog Italic (1922, Benton), sometimes credited to Charles H. Becker or Wadsworth A. Parker by varying authorities.
- Goudy Handtooled + italic (1922 Wadsworth A. Parker), alternately credited to either Charles H. Becker or Benton.
- Goudytype (1928, Goudy), designed and cut in 1916, not cast and sold until later.
- Gravure (1927, Benton)
- Graybar (1930, Wadsworth A. Parker)
- Grayda (1939, Frank H. Riley)
- Greeting Monotone (1927, Benton)
- Headline Gothic (1936, Benton), not to be confused with the Ludlow font of the same name.
- Hobo (1910, Benton)
  - Light Hobo (1915, Benton)
- Hollywood (1932, Willard T. Sniffin)
- Heritage (1952, Walter H. McKay)
- Huxley Vertical (Walter Huxley, 1935)
- Invitation Shaded (1916, Benton)
  - Invitation (1917, Benton)
- Jenson series
  - Jenson Oldstyle + italic (1893, Phinney), based on William Morris's Golden Type, matrices cut by John F. Cumming from drawings by Phinney.
  - Jenson Heavyface (1899, Phinney)
  - Jenson Condensed + Bold Condensed (1901, Phinney)
- Jim Crow (1933), originally cast in 1850s by Dickinson Type Foundry as Gothic Shade. And also as Tombstone, following the ATF merger in 1894.
- Kaufmann Script + Bold (1936, Max R. Kaufmann)
- Keynote (1932, Willard T. Sniffin)
- Lexington (1926, Wadsworth A. Parker with Clarence P. Hornung)
- Liberty Script (1927, Willard T. Sniffin)
- Lightline Gothic (1908, Benton), essentially a News Gothic ultra light.
- Louvaine series
  - Louvaine (medium) + Italic (1929, Benton)
  - Louvaine Light + Italic
  - Louvaine Bold + Italic
- Lydian series (1938, Warren Chappell)
  - Lydian + Italic (1938, Chappell)
  - Lydian Bold + Italic (1938, Chappell)
  - Lydian Cursive (1940, Chappell)
  - Lydian Condensed + Italic (1946, Chappell)
- Miehle Extra Condensed + Title (1905, Benton)
- Missal Initials (1904, Will H. Bradley)
- Modernique (1928, Benton)
- Modernistic (1928, Wadsworth A. Parker)
- Monotone Gothic (1907, Benton)
- Motto (1915, Benton)
- Murray Hill + Bold (1956, Emil J. Klumpp)
- National Old Style (1916, Goudy), quite similar to his Nabisco.
- Newport (1932, Willard T. Sniffin)
- News Gothic series
  - News Gothic (1908, Benton)
  - News Gothic Italic (Benton)
  - News Gothic Condensed (Benton)
  - News Gothic Extra Condensed (Benton)
  - News Gothic Extra Condensed Title (Benton)
  - News Gothic Bold (Benton)
  - News Gothic Condensed Bold (Benton)
- Norwood Roman (1906, Benton), made for J. S. Cushing's Norwood Press.
- Novel Gothic (1928, Benton), completed from drawings by ATF matrix cuter Charles H. Becker.
- Nubian (1928, Willard T. Sniffin)
- Onyx (1937, Gerry Powell)
- P. T. Barnum (1933), loosely based on French Clarendon.
- Pabst Old Style or Pabst Roman (1902, Goudy), based on hand lettering done by Goudy for advertisements for the Pabst Brewing Company, though commissioned by Schlesinger & Mayer, a Chicago department store. Cast by Goudy with the proviso that the department store would have the exclusive use of the font for a time before it would be offered to the public. These were the first matrices cut by Robert Wiebking for Goudy.
  - Pabst Roman Italic (1903, Goudy)
- Packard (1913, Benton), based on lettering by Oz Cooper
  - Packard Bold (1916, Benton)
- Paramount (1929, Benton)
- Park Avenue (1933, Robert E. Smith)
- Parisian (1928, Benton)
- Pericles (1934, Robert Foster)
- Phenix (1935, Benton), originally called Acquitaine.
- Piranesi series (1930, Willard T. Sniffin)
  - Piranesi Italic (1930, Benton)
  - Piranesi Bold Italic (1931, Benton)
  - Piranesi Bold (1933, Benton)
- Poster Gothic (1934, Benton), essentially larger sizes (24 pt. +) of Bank Gothic Condensed Medium.
- Railroad Gothic (1906)
- Raleigh Cursive (1930, Willard T. Sniffin)
- Raleigh Gothic (Condensed) (1932, Benton)
- Repro Script (1953, Jerry Mullen)
- Rockwell Antique (1931, Benton), an updating of Inland Type Foundry's Litho Antique, later revised yet again as Stymie Bold.
- Romani (1934, A. R. Bosco)
- Rosetti (1931, Willard T. Sniffin)
- Roycroft (c. 1898, Benton), inspired by lettering in the Saturday Evening Post and often credited to Lewis Buddy.
- Rugged Roman (1917, Benton), designed 1909-11, patented in 1915, earliest showing 1917.
- Satanick (1896, Phinney), based on William Morris's Troy and Chaucer, matrices cut by John F. Cumming from drawings by Phinney.
- Souvenir (1914, Benton), later Ed Benguiat's photo-type versions of this type would achieve huge popularity.
- Schoolbook Oldstyle (1924, Benton)
  - Schoolbook Oldstyle Italic (1928, Benton)
- Shadow (1934, Benton)
- Spartan series (1939, John L. Renshaw and Gerry Powell), a knockoff of Futura.
  - Spartan Book + Italic (Renshaw)
  - Spartan Medium + Italic (Renshaw)
  - Spartan Heavy + Italic (Renshaw)
  - Spartan Black + Italic (1940, Renshaw)
  - Spartan Extra Black (mid-1950s)
  - Spartan Book Condensed (Renshaw)
  - Spartan Medium Condensed (Renshaw)
  - Spartan Black Condensed + Italic (Renshaw)
- Sterling (1917, Benton)
  - Sterling Cursive (1919, Benton)
- Stencil (1937, Gerry Powell)
- Stymie series, cast up to 288 point, Stymie is believed to be the largest type ever to be cast in regular molds. The “W” alone weighed two pounds!
  - Stymie Light + Light Italic + Medium + Medium Italic + Bold + Bold Italic (1931–35, Benton)
  - Stymie Bold Condensed (1937, Gerry Powell)
  - Stymie Condensed (1937, Sol Hess)
  - Stymie Compressed (1932, Wadsworth A. Parker)
  - Stymie Extra Bold (1934, Sol Hess)
  - Stymie Inline Title (1932, Wadsworth A. Parker)
- Taylor Gothic (1897, Phinney), capitals only, lower-case based on Central Type Foundry of St. Louis' Quentell. Later re-worked by either Benton or Goudy as Globe Gothic.
- Thermotype (1931, Benton), with three widths on the same basic design they prefigured the failed Univers by some twenty years.
- Thompson Quill Script (1953, Tommy Thompson), this was also made available for phototypesetting by Photo Lettering Inc.
- Thunderbird (1920)
- Touraine Oldstyle Italic (1898, Phinney)
- Tower (1934, Benton), similar to Stymie Medium Condensed.
- Typo Roman Shaded (1924, Benton)
  - Typo Roman (1926, Benton)
- Typo Script + extended (1902, Benton), originally Tiffany Script.
- Typo Upright (1905, Benton), originally Tiffany Upright
- Vanity Initials (1927, Will H. Bradley)
- Venetian + Italic (1911, Benton)
  - Venetian Bold (1913, Benton)
- Wayside Roman (1900, Will H. Bradley)
- Wedding Text (1901, Benton)
  - Wedding Text Shaded (1913, Benton)
- Whedons Gothic Outline (1965, Whedon Davis)

== Barnhart Brothers & Spindler ==
These foundry types were originally cast by Barnhart Brothers & Spindler:

A sample of Cooper Black.

- Adcraft (typeface),
  - Adcraft lightface, 8-48pt, or Puritan, Hansen (8-48pt) ATF 1501
  - Adcraft Medium, 6-72pt, ATF 1502
  - Adcraft Bold or Plymouth (typeface), 6-120pt
  - Adcraft Black or Plymouth Bold (typeface), 6-72pt, ATF 1500
- Boul Mich (1927, Oz Cooper)
- Cooper series
  - Cooper (1918, Oz Cooper) originally Cooper Oldstyle Roman
  - Cooper Italic (1924, Oz Cooper) included swash characters.
- Cooper Black series
  - Cooper Black + Italic + Hilite (1922, Oz Cooper), this became ATF's second-best-selling type, after Copperplate Gothic.
  - Cooper Black Condensed (1926, Oz Cooper) 20% lighter than the Cooper Black, the designer described it as “condensed but not squeezed.”
  - Cooper Tooled Italic, not designed by Oz Cooper, but was actually a knock-off of a Cooper Italic by a German foundry.
- Cooper Fullface + Italic (1929, Oz Cooper)
- Dietz Text (c. 1927, Oz Cooper), from original drawings made by August Dietz.
- Fifteenth Century (c. 1897, Berne Nadall), later released by ATF as Caslon Antique.
- Pompeian Cursive (1927, Oz Cooper)

== Bruce Type Foundry ==
These foundry types were originally cast by the Bruce Type Foundry:

- Goldrush (c. 1885)

== Central Type Foundry ==
These foundry types were originally cast by the Central Type Foundry of Saint Louis:

- De Vinne (1898, Gustav Schroeder), named in honor of Theodore Low De Vinne, probably based upon Schelter & Giesecke's Romanisch.
  - De Vinne Roman](1898, Goudy), a book face based on Schroeder's display type.
- Othello (1934, Benton), a revision of an 1884 Central Type Foundry face.

== Dickenson Type Foundry ==
These foundry types were originally cast by Dickenson Type Foundry:

- Camelot (1896, Goudy), Goudy designed only the capitals, lower-case letters were evidently added by Dickinson/ATF designer Phinney. A delicate display face with small wedge serifs.
- Card Mercantile (1901, Benton), a redesign of the two smallest sizes of an 1890s Dickinson Type Foundry design that ATF had acquired when the companies merged in 1896.

== Inland Type Foundry ==
These foundry types were originally cast by Inland Type Foundry and sometimes later modified:

- Card Litho + Card Light Litho (1917, Benton), a modification of a 1907 ITF design that ATF had acquired when the companies merged in 1912.
- American Caslon (1919, Benton), based on the foundry's Inland New Caslon, a version of a face originally cut by William Caslon in the 18th century.
- Light Oldstyle (1916), probably an old font from ITF, but sometimes credited to Benton.
- Litho Antique, later updated as Rockwell Antique.
- Pen Print Open (1921, Benton), based on the ITF design of 1911.

== Keystone Type Foundry ==
These foundry types were originally cast by Keystone Type Foundry:

- John Hancock (1905)
- Powell (1903, Goudy), commissioned by one Mr. Powell, then advertising manager for Mandel Brothers department store (earlier he had commissioned Pabst Old Style for another store), and named after him.

== Marder, Luse, & Co. ==
These foundry types were originally cast by Marder, Luse, & Co.:

- Copperplate Gothic Series
  - Copperplate Gothic Heavy (1905, Goudy), originally designed for Marder, Luse, & Co., ATF immediately adopted it and made it the first in a hugely successful series.
- P. T. Barnum (1938 + 1949) a revival of Marder, Luse, & Co.'s nineteenth century French Clarendon, also known as Italian Condensed.

== H.C. Hansen Type Foundry ==
These foundry types were originally cast by H.C. Hansen Type Foundry:

- Buffalo, originally cast in 1904 as Kolonial by the Woellmer Type Foundry, also cast as Columbia by the Amsterdam Type foundry.

== Nineteenth Century Faces ==
These foundry types were cast before the consolidation by unspecified foundries:

- Altona
- Octic
- Telescope
- Turius
