= List of typefaces designed by Morris Fuller Benton =

A sample of News Gothic.

A sample of Bank Gothic.

A sample of Franklin Gothic.

All of Benton's typefaces were cut by American Type Founders.

- Roycroft (c. 1898), inspired by lettering in the Saturday Evening Post and often credited to Lewis Buddy, though (according to ATF) designed “partly” by Benton.
- Century series, based on the original Century Roman cut by Linn Boyd Benton.
  - Century Roman sub-series
    - Century Expanded (1900)
    - Century Italic + Century Bold (1905)
    - Century Bold Condensed (1909)
    - Century Bold Extended (1910)
  - Century Oldstyle sub-series
    - Century Oldstyle + italic + bold (1909)
    - Century Oldstyle Bold Italic (1910)
    - Century Oldstyle Bold Condensed (1915)
  - Century Catalog sub-series
    - Century Catalog (1917)
  - Century Schoolbook sub-series
    - Century Schoolbook (1918), commissioned by textbook publishers Ginn & Company for maximum legibility.
    - Century Schoolbook Italic (1921)
    - Century Schoolbook Bold (1923)
    - Century Schoolbook Monospace (1918)
- Globe Gothic (c. 1900), a refinement of Taylor Gothic, designed by ATF vice-president Joseph W. Phinney in 1897 for Charles H. Taylor for the exclusive use of the Boston Globe.
  - Globe Gothic Condensed + Extra Condensed + Extended (c. 1900)
  - Globe Gothic Bold (1907), credited to Benton, though Frederic Goudy claims Phinney commissioned him to do it.
  - Globe Gothic Bold Italic (1908)
- Card Mercantile (1901), a redesign of the two smallest sizes of an 1890s Dickinson Type Foundry design that ATF had acquired when the companies merged in 1896.
- Wedding Text (1901)
  - Wedding Text Shaded (1913)
- Typo Script + extended (1902), originally ‘‘Tiffany Script’’.
- Engravers Bold (1902, also cast by Barnhart Brothers & Spindler)
- Franklin Gothic series, the patriarch of American sans-serif faces, named for Benjamin Franklin, America’s greatest printer.
  - Franklin Gothic (1903)
  - Franklin Gothic Condensed + Extra Condensed (1906)
  - Franklin Gothic Italic (1910)
  - Franklin Gothic Condensed Shaded (1912)
- Alternate Gothic, Nos. 1,2,3 (1903)
- Cheltenham series, based on the original Cheltenham designed by Bertram Goodhue.
  - Cheltenham Bold (1903)
  - Cheltenham Bold Condensed (1904)
  - Cheltenham Bold Italic + Cheltenham Bold Condensed Italic + Cheltenham Wide + Cheltenham Bold Outline (1905)
  - Cheltenham Bold Extra Condensed + Cheltenham Bold Extended (1906)
  - Cheltenham Inline + Cheltenham Inline Extra Condensed'
  - Cheltenham Inline Extended (1907)
  - Cheltenham Oldstyle Condensed + Cheltenham Medium (1909)
  - Cheltenham Medium Italic + Cheltenham Extra Bold (1910)
  - Cheltenham Bold Shaded + Cheltenham Bold Italic Shaded + Cheltenham Extra Bold Shaded (1912)
  - Cheltenham Medium Condensed + Cheltenham Medium Expanded (1913)
- Bulfinch Oldstyle (1903), commissioned by the Curtis Publishing Company and prepared by Benton for production from original designs by William Martin Johnson. The “house face” of Ladies’ Home Journal from 1903, offered for general use in 1905.
- Bold Antique (1904)
  - Bold Antique Condensed (1908/9 ?)
  - Re-issued as Whittin Black and Whittin Black Condensed (1960)
- Cloister Black (1904), a blackletter design not connected to Benton's Cloister roman font. Usually credited to Joseph W. Phinney, but many authorities give full credit to Benton. It is an adaptation of Priory Text, an 1870s version of William Caslon's Caslon Text of 1734. Lower-case letters are identical with Phinney's earlier Flemish Black (1902).
- Miehle Extra Condensed + Title (1905)
- Typo Upright (1905), originally Tiffany Upright.
- Cushing Antique (1905), design suggested by J.S. Cushing
- Engravers Shaded (1906)
- Norwood Roman (1906), made for J. S. Cushing’s Norwood Press.
- Engravers Old English (1906), based upon Caslon Text and designed in association with "Cowan" or perhaps Joseph W. Phinney.
  - Engravers Old English Bold (1910)
- Clearface series, designed with the help of his father, Linn Boyd Benton.
  - Clearface (1907)
  - Clearface Bold + Italic
  - Clearface Heavy + Italic
  - Clearface Italic
- Monotone Gothic (1907)
- News Gothic series
  - News Gothic (1908)
  - News Gothic Italic
  - News Gothic Condensed
  - News Gothic Extra Condensed
  - News Gothic Extra Condensed Title
  - News Gothic Bold
  - News Gothic Condensed Bold
- Lightline Gothic (1908), essentially a News Gothic ultra light.
- Commercial Script (1908)
- Bodoni series, first American revival of the faces of Giambattista Bodoni.
  - Bodoni (1909)
  - Bodoni Italic (1910)
  - Bodoni Book (1910)
  - Bodoni Book Italic (1911)
  - Bodoni Bold + Italic (1911)
  - Bodoni Bold Shaded (1912)
  - Bodoni Shaded Initials (1914)
  - Card Bodoni (1915)
  - Card Bodoni Bold (1917)
  - Bodoni Open (1918)
  - Bodoni Book Expanded (1924)
  - Ultra Bodoni + italic(1928)
  - Bodoni Bold Condensed (1933)
  - Ultra Bodoni Condensed + extra condensed (1933)
  - Engravers Bodoni (1933), designed in 1926.
- Hobo (1910)
  - Light Hobo (1915)
- Clearface Gothic (1910)
- Venetian + Italic (1911)
  - Venetian Bold (1913)
- Copperplate Gothic Shaded (1912), an addition to Goudy’s Copperplate series.
- Cloister series
  - Cloister Old Style (1913), based on the 1470 Venetian face of Nicolas Jenson.
  - Cloister Italic (1913), based on the 1501 italic face of Aldus Manutius.
  - Cloister Bold Condensed (1917)
  - Cloister Cursive (1922)
  - Cloister Lightface (1924)
  - Cloister Lightface Italic (1925)
  - Cloister Cursive Handtooled (1926), with Charles H. Becker.
- Della Robbia Light (1913), based on T.M. Cleland’s Della Robbia. Later copied by Damon & Peat as Armstrong.
- Cromwell (1913), uses capital letters from Benton’s Cloister Old Style.
- Packard (1913), based on lettering by Oswald Cooper
  - Packard Bold (1916)
- Antique Shaded (1914), cut on a new shading machine invented by Linn Boyd Benton.
- Lithographic Shaded (1914), a half-shaded version of Engravers Shaded by W. F. Capitian.
- Adscript (1914)
- Souvenir (1914), later Ed Benguiat's photo-type versions of this type would achieve huge popularity.
- Light Oldstyle (1916), possibly an old front from Inland Type Foundry, but sometimes credited to Benton.
- Invitation Shaded (1916)
  - Invitation (1917)
- Goudy series (1916), based on Goudy’s Goudy Old Style.
  - Goudy Title (1918)
  - Goudy Bold Italic + Goudy Catalog (1919)
  - Goudy Catalog Italic (1922), credited to Benton, Charles H. Becker, or Wadsworth A. Parker by varying authorities.
- Garamond series, based upon the designs of 16th-century type founder, Claude Garamond.
  - Garamond (1919), with T.M. Cleland
  - Garamond Bold (1920)
  - Garamond Italic (1923), with T.M. Cleland
  - Garamond Open (1931)
- Baskerville Roman + Italic (1915), after the Fry Foundry version.
- Motto (1915)
- Sterling (1917)
  - Sterling Cursive (1919)
- Freehand (1917)
- Rugged Roman (1917?), designed 1909-11, patented in 1915, earliest showing 1917.
- Card Litho + Card Light Litho (1917), a modification of a 1907 Inland Type Foundry design that ATF had acquired when the companies merged in 1912.
- Announcement Roman + Italic (1918)
- American Caslon (1919), based on the Inland Type Foundry's Inland New Caslon, a version of a face originally cut by William Caslon in the 18th century.
- Pen Print Open (1921), based on the Inland Type Foundry design of 1911.
- Civilité (1922), a modern adaptation of Robert Granjon’s face cut in 1557.
- Typo Roman Shaded (1924)
- Schoolbook Oldstyle (1924)
  - Schoolbook Oldstyle Italic (1928)
- Card Roman (1925)
- Typo Roman (1926)
- Canterbury (1926)
- Bulmer Roman (1926), based on a face cut by William Martin for the printer William Bulmer in 1790.
  - Bulmer Roman Italic (1927)
- Greeting Monotone (1927)
- Gravure (1927)
- Galia (1927), most sources attribute this to Wadsworth A. Parker.
- Broadway (1928), capital letters only. Lower case letters were later cut by Sol Hess for the Lanston Monotype copy.
  - Broadway Condensed (1929), capitals + lower-case
- Modernique (1928)
- Novel Gothic (1928), completed from drawings by ATF matrix cuter Charles H. Becker.
- Chic (1928)
- Parisian (1928)
- Louvaine series
  - Louvaine (medium) + Italic (1929)
  - Louvaine Light + Italic
  - Louvaine Bold + Italic
- Paramount (1929)
- Bank Gothic series
  - Bank Gothic Light (1930)
  - Bank Gothic Medium (1932)
  - Bank Gothic Bold (1932)
  - Bank Gothic Light Condensed (1933)
  - Bank Gothic Medium Condensed (1933)
  - Bank Gothic Bold Condensed (1933)
- Dynamic Medium (1930)
- Piranesi series, roman by Willard T. Sniffin.
  - Piranesi Italic (1930)
  - Piranesi Bold Italic (1931)
  - Piranesi Bold (1933)
- Engravers Text (1930)
- Rockwell Antique (1931), an updating of Inland Type Foundry’s Litho Antique, later revised yet again as Stymie Bold.
- Stymie series, cast up to 288 point, Stymie is believed to be the largest type ever to be cast in regular molds. The “W” alone weighed two pounds!
  - Stymie Bold + Light + Medium + Light Italic + Medium Italic (1931)
  - Stymie Bold Italic
- Thermotype (1931), with three widths on the same basic design they prefigured the failed Univers. by some twenty years.
- American Text (1932)
- Raleigh Gothic (Condensed) (1932)
- Agency Gothic (1933)
  - Agency Gothic Open (1934)
- Tower (1934), similar to Stymie Medium Condensed.
- Eagle Bold (1934), a variant of Novel Gothic, designed for the NRA, used on their Blue Eagle posters.
- Poster Gothic (1934), essentially larger sizes (24 pt. +) of Bank Gothic Condensed Medium.
- Benton (1934), designed as Cambridge, released as Benton, reïntroduced in 1953 as Whitehall.
- American Backslant (1934)
- Othello (1934), a revision of an 1884 face issued by the Central Type Foundry of Saint Louis (merged with ATF in 1892), though just as probably a big F-U to Bauer Type Foundry for Futura Display.
- Shadow (1934)
- Headline Gothic (1935)
- Phenix (1935), originally called Acquitaine.
- Headline Gothic (1936), not to be confused with the Ludlow font of the same name.
- Empire (1937), no lower-case.
