= Charles S. Benton =

American politician and judge

Charles Swan Benton
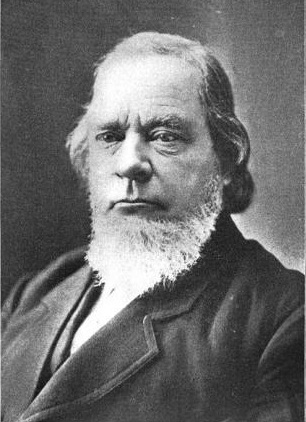

Member of the U.S. House of Representatives from New York's 17th district
- In office March 4, 1843 – March 3, 1847
- Preceded by: David P. Brewster (Seat A); John G. Floyd (Seat B)
- Succeeded by: George Petrie

Personal details
- Born: July 12, 1810 Fryeburg, Oxford County, Massachusetts (now part of Maine)
- Died: May 4, 1882 (aged 71) La Crosse, La Crosse County, Wisconsin
- Citizenship: US
- Party: Democratic Party
- Spouse(s): Emeline Fuller Benton; Elizabeth B. Reynolds Benton
- Children: Linn B. Benton; Charles R. Benton
- Profession: Editor; Attorney; Politician

Charles Swan Benton (July 12, 1810 – May 4, 1882) was an American politician who served two terms as a United States representative from New York from 1843 to 1847.

== Biography ==
Born in Fryeburg, Oxford County, Maine, Benton was the son of Dr. Joseph and Catherine Benton and the brother of Nathaniel S. Benton. He pursued preparatory studies before moving to Herkimer County, New York in 1824 to live with an elder brother. Later, he attended Lowville Academy at Lowville, New York. Benton also learned the tanner’s trade, but left the trade and became the editor of the Mohawk Courier and the Little Falls Gazette from 1830 to 1832. During that time he also studied law and was admitted to the bar in 1835 and commenced practice at Little Falls, New York. He married Emeline Fuller in 1840 and they had one son, Linn Boyd Benton (named for his colleague Linn Boyd), who became an inventor and engineer, and co-founded the printing company American Type Founders. Linn Benton's son (and Charles's grandson), Morris Fuller Benton, would become one of the most prolific American type designers of his era through his work for ATF. He married again in 1853 to Elizabeth B. Reynolds and they also had one son, Charles R. Benton.

== Career ==
Benton was Surrogate of Herkimer County from 1837 to 1841 and was also a judge advocate of the New York State Militia.

Elected as a Democrat to the 28th and 29th United States Congresses, Benton served as a U. S. Representative for the seventeenth district of New York from March 4, 1843, to March 3, 1847.

Benton was Clerk of the New York Court of Appeals from 1847 to 1853 having been elected in 1847 and 1850. He moved to Milwaukee, Wisconsin in 1855 and subsequently became editor of the Milwaukee News.

Appointed by President Franklin Pierce in 1856 as Register of the United States Land Office at La Crosse, Wisconsin, Benton served until 1861. In 1862 he was an unsuccessful candidate for election to the 38th United States Congress. He engaged in agricultural pursuits near West Salem, Wisconsin and later, in 1865, at Galesburg, Illinois. He returned to La Crosse, Wisconsin in 1869 and served as judge of La Crosse County, Wisconsin from 1874 to 1881.

== Death ==
Benton died in La Crosse, La Crosse County, Wisconsin, on May 4, 1882 (age 71 years, 296 days). He is interred at Oak Grove Cemetery, La Crosse, Wisconsin.

U.S. House of Representatives
Preceded by David P. Brewster (Seat A); John G. Floyd (Seat B)	Member of the U.S. House of Representatives from New York's 17th congressional district March 4, 1843 – March 3, 1847	Succeeded by George Petrie
Legal offices
Preceded by new office	Clerk of the New York Court of Appeals; 1847–1853	Succeeded by Benjamin F. Harwood
