= Constructa =

Constructa may refer to:

- a digitized form of Tower (typeface), a slab serif typeface
- Constructa (company), a German brand of major appliances from the manufacturer Constructa-Neff
