= Balloon (typeface) =

- Category: Script
- Designer: Max R. Kaufmann
- Foundry: ATF
- Date created: 1939
- Sample

Balloon is a brush script commonly used for signage or display purposes. It was designed in 1939 by Max R. Kaufmann, for American Type Founders, in response to Howard Allen Trafton's Cartoon, cut for Bauer Type Foundry in 1936. It had no lowercase letters and was cast in Light, Bold, and Extra Bold. The two lighter weights were identical with Kaufmann Script and so could be used as alternate capitals for that face.

The font was most famously used for the typeface of the Nickelodeon, Nick Jr. and Nicktoons logos from October 1, 1984 to September 27, 2009 in white letters with an orange background (orange and blue background for Nick Jr.). It is also notably used in the Madeline books, TV series and film.

This font was digitized by the now-defunct Bitstream Inc. It is also used as an available uniform font in the Pro Evolution Soccer franchise.
