= Cincinnati Type Foundry =

American typography company

- Company type: Defunct
- Founded: Cincinnati, Ohio, 1826
- Defunct: Merged into A.T.F., 1892
- Headquarters: Cincinnati, Ohio
- Key people: John P. Foote, Oliver Wells, founders, Henry Barth, president

The Cincinnati Type Foundry was a manufacturer of typefaces, matrices and other type-related equipment in Cincinnati, Ohio, established in 1826 by John P. Foote and Oliver Wells. In 1892 it was merged into American Type Founders.

== Role During American Civil War ==
During the American Civil War, the Cincinnati Type Foundry played multiple roles. Henry Barth contributed to bringing printmaking to the battlefields with the designing of the Army Press. The minimal design of the Army Press made it an economical printing option for small printing jobs, making it appealing for civilian use outside of wartime. The foundry also made bullets during the Civil War for Union troops and was involved in manufacturing 13 Gatling guns.

== Images ==
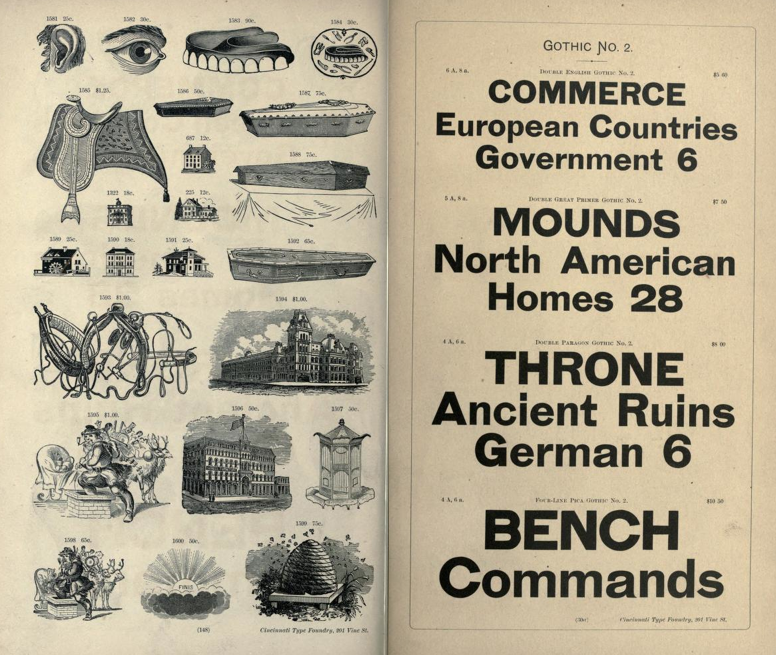
Pages from Cincinnati Type Foundry's specimen book, 1882

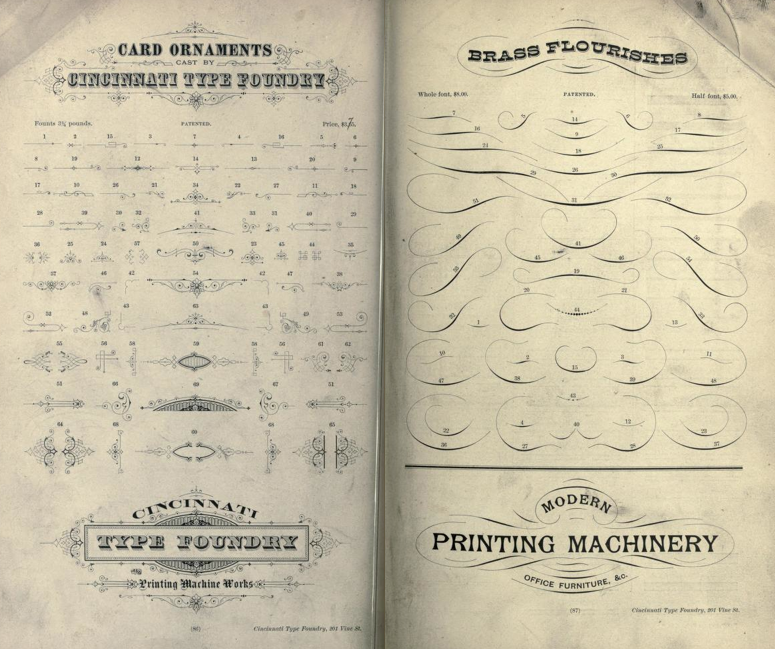
Pages from Cincinnati Type Foundry's specimen book, 1882

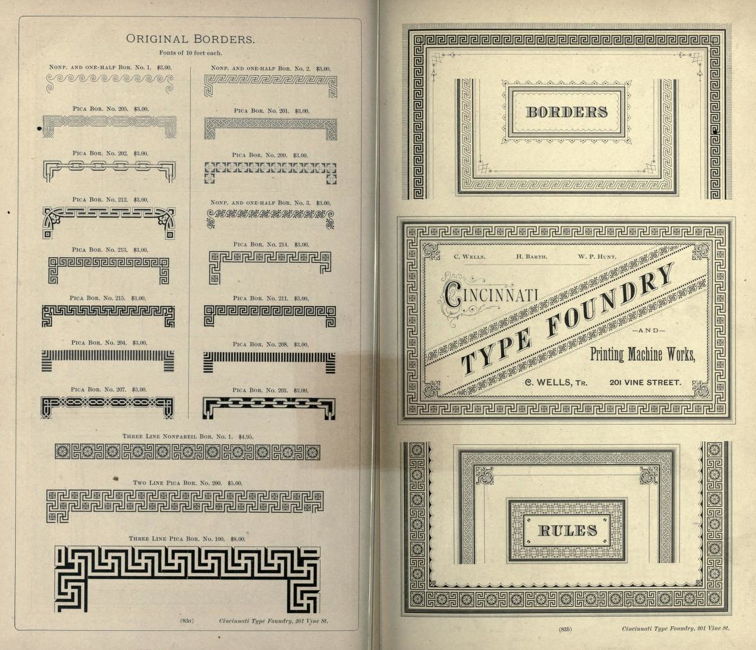
Pages from Cincinnati Type Foundry's specimen book, 1882

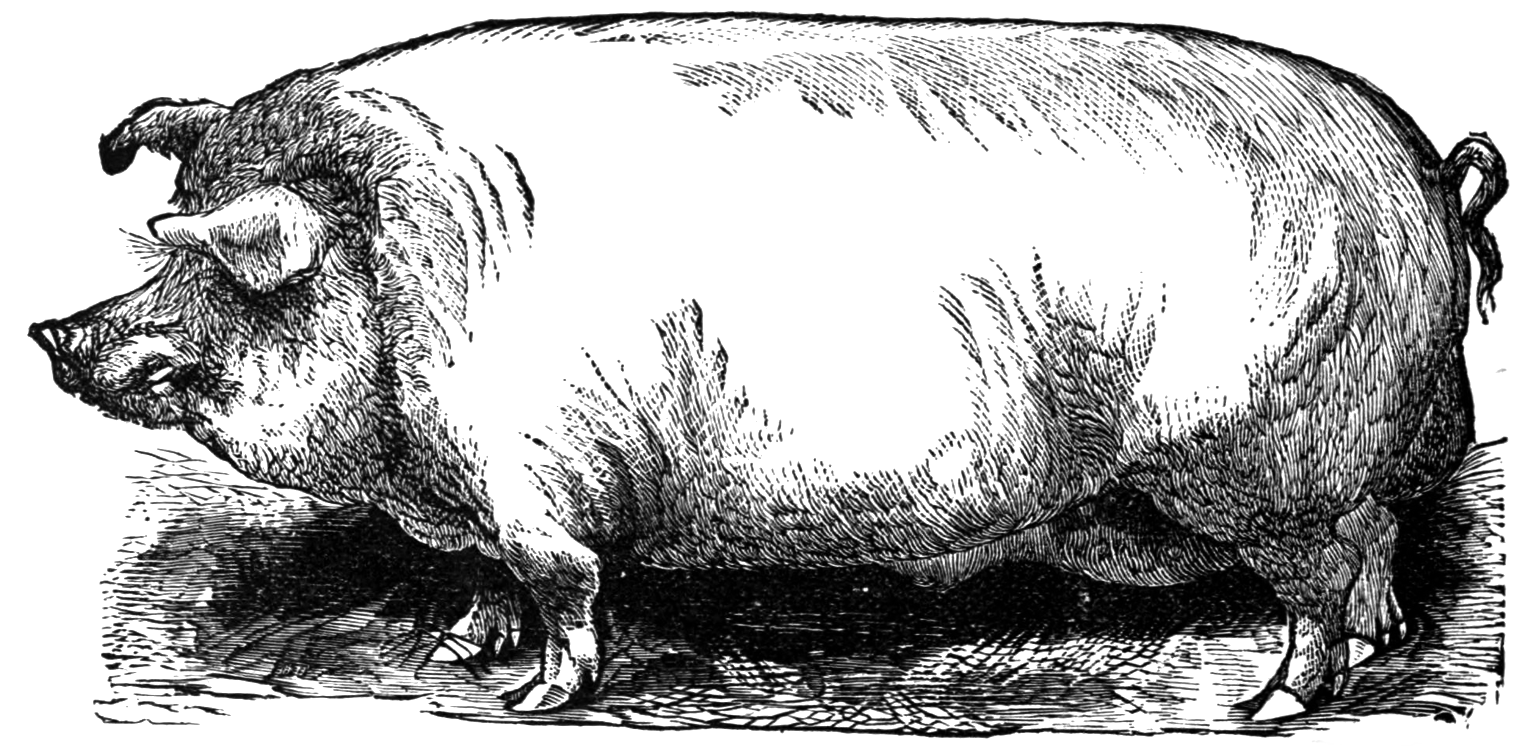
Hog engraving from specimen book of the Cincinnati Type Foundry, 1882

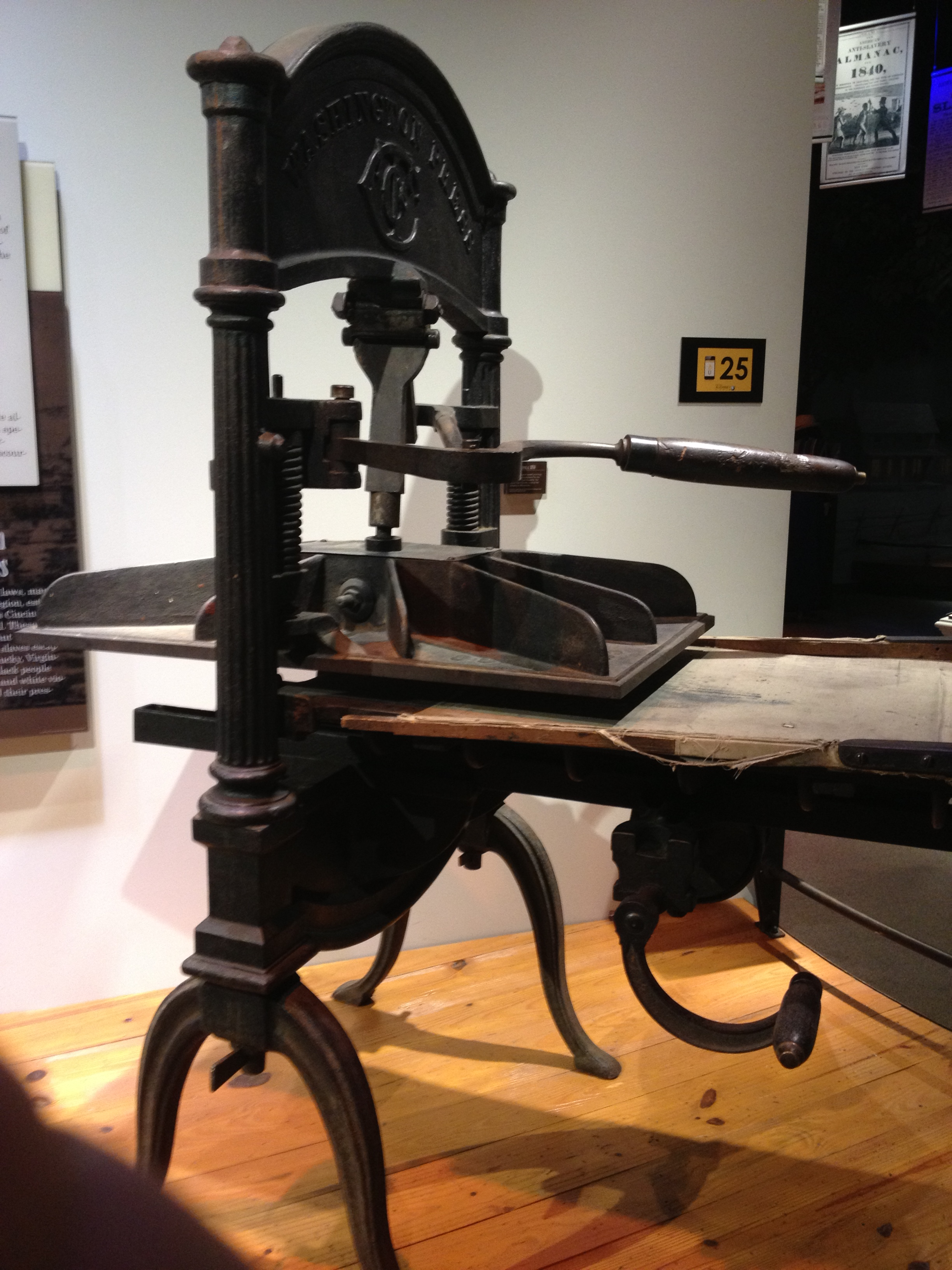
Printing Press From Cincinnati Type Foundry, 1850
