= Golding & Company =

Golding & Company was an American manufacturer of platen printing presses and printers' tools, established in 1869 by William Hughson Golding (1845–1916) in the Fort Hill area of Boston, Massachusetts.

== History ==
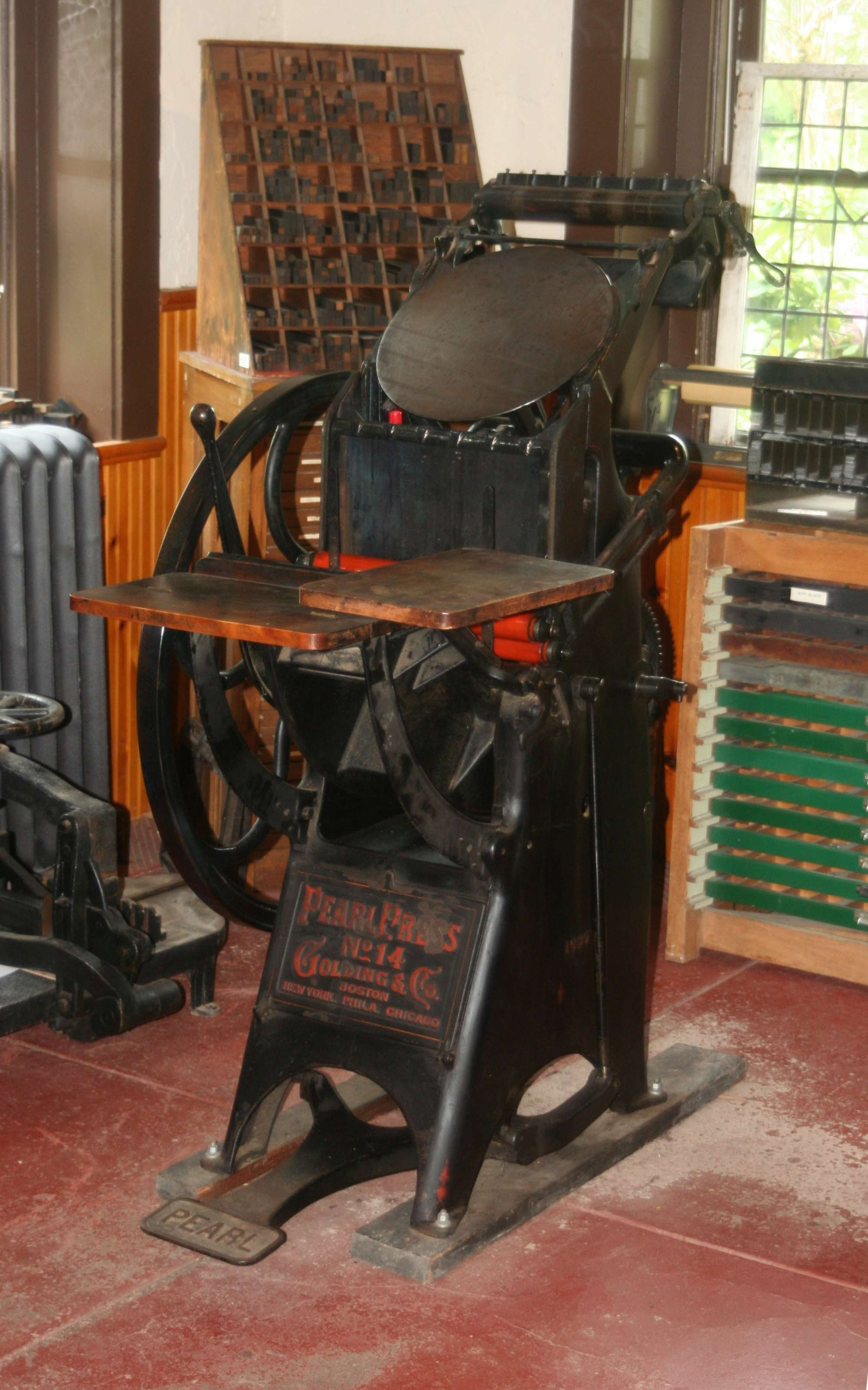
Pearl letterpress used by the Roycroft arts and crafts community

Before 1895, Golding hired Henry Lewis Bullen to print its house organ, which increased sales of the Pearl. In 1906, Golding's factories moved to Franklin, Massachusetts; its showrooms remained in Boston.

William Golding died in 1916, but his two sons continued the enterprise. In 1918, Golding was acquired by American Type Founders (ATF). The Pearl continued to be made and sold by the Golding Press Division of ATF. In 1927, Thomson National Company (manufacturers of the Colt's Armory Press) bought Golding from ATF.

In 1936, the Craftsmen Machinery Company, of Dedham, Massachusetts, somehow acquired jigs and patterns for the 7 x 11 Improved Pearl, selling it as the CMC Jobber until 1955.

== Printing presses ==
- Official (~1872)
- Pearl (1876)
- Improved Pearl (1895)
- Jobber

== Archives ==
The business records of Golding & Co. are held in the Department of Printing and Graphic Arts at Houghton Library, Harvard University. The collection includes business records, patents, designs, and catalogues of Golding equipment.
