= Marder, Luse, & Co. =

- Company type: Defunct
- Industry: Type foundry
- Founded: Chicago, Illinois,1855
- Defunct: Merged into A.T.F., 1892
- Headquarters: Chicago, Illinois, United States
- Key people: C. G. Sheffield, founder, Elihu White, owner, John Marder, David Scofield, A. P. Luse, partners
- Number of employees: 70 (1869)

Marder, Luse, & Co. was founded in 1855 as the Chicago Type Foundry and Printer's Warehouse by C. G. Sheffield as branch of Elihu White's New York foundry, Farmer, Little & Co. This was the first type foundry to operate in Chicago. In 1863 the firm was purchased by John Marder, a bookkeeper for the firm, David Scofield, and John Collins Marder’s father-in-law who was also an employee of the foundry. The new company provided foundry type, electrotypes, stereotypes and letterpress printer's supplies. A. P. Luse became a partner in 1869 it became Marder, Luse & Company.

After being all but destroyed in the Chicago Fire of 1871 Marder Luse re-opened in April 1872 as the largest type foundry in the west. In 1879 the firm began selling type using American Point system of standard type sizes in an age when most foundries cast in their own sizes.

A year after A. P. Luse died in 1891, the foundry became one of the twenty-three foundries that merged to become American Type Founders. After the merger Marder, served as Western general manager.

== Typefaces ==
These foundry types were originally cast by Marder, Luse, & Co.:

- French Clarendon a nineteenth century face that was re-released by ATF as P. T. Barnum. Also known as Italian Condensed.
