= Jim Crow (typeface) =

Jim Crowe
- Category: Display
- Classification: Grotesque sans-serif
- Foundry: Dickinson Type Foundry
- Date released: 1850, 1933, 1949
- Re-issuing foundries: ATF, Los Angeles Type Foundry, Skyline Type Foundry
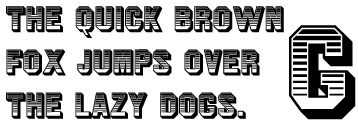
- Sample

Jim Crow is the American Type Founders' 1933 and 1949 re-casting of the Dickinson Type Foundry's type of the 1850s, Gothic Shade. Dickenson, a Boston type foundry, had been incorporated into ATF in the original merger of 1892. The face was also known as Tombstone. ATF only cast the face in 24 point, but later versions by the Los Angeles Type Foundry were cast from 18 to 30 point. It was often used to indicate political motifs. While cold type versions were popular right through the 1970s, no major foundry has issued a digital version, and it is seldom used today. Foundry Harold's Fonts has released a digitised version named Jim Dandy.

== See also ==
- Samples of display typefaces
