= Spartan (typeface) =

Geometric sans-serif typeface

- Category: Sans-serif
- Classification: Geometric sans-serif
- Designer: John L. Renshaw
- Foundry: Linotype; American Type Founders
- Date released: 1939
- Design based on: Futura
- Trademark: Linotype

Spartan is a geometric sans-serif typeface created for Mergenthaler Linotype Company as a direct competitor to Bauer's Futura. The face was made for machine composition by Linotype, while identical foundry type was issued by American Type Founders (ATF). Although some have credited John L. Renshaw with the design of Spartan, he worked at ATF, not Linotype, and only worked on the designs of some additional weights of Spartan for ATF which Linotype did not offer. Testing by Bausch & Lomb, after the creation of Spartan in 1951, determined it to be the "most readable" typeface of the time.

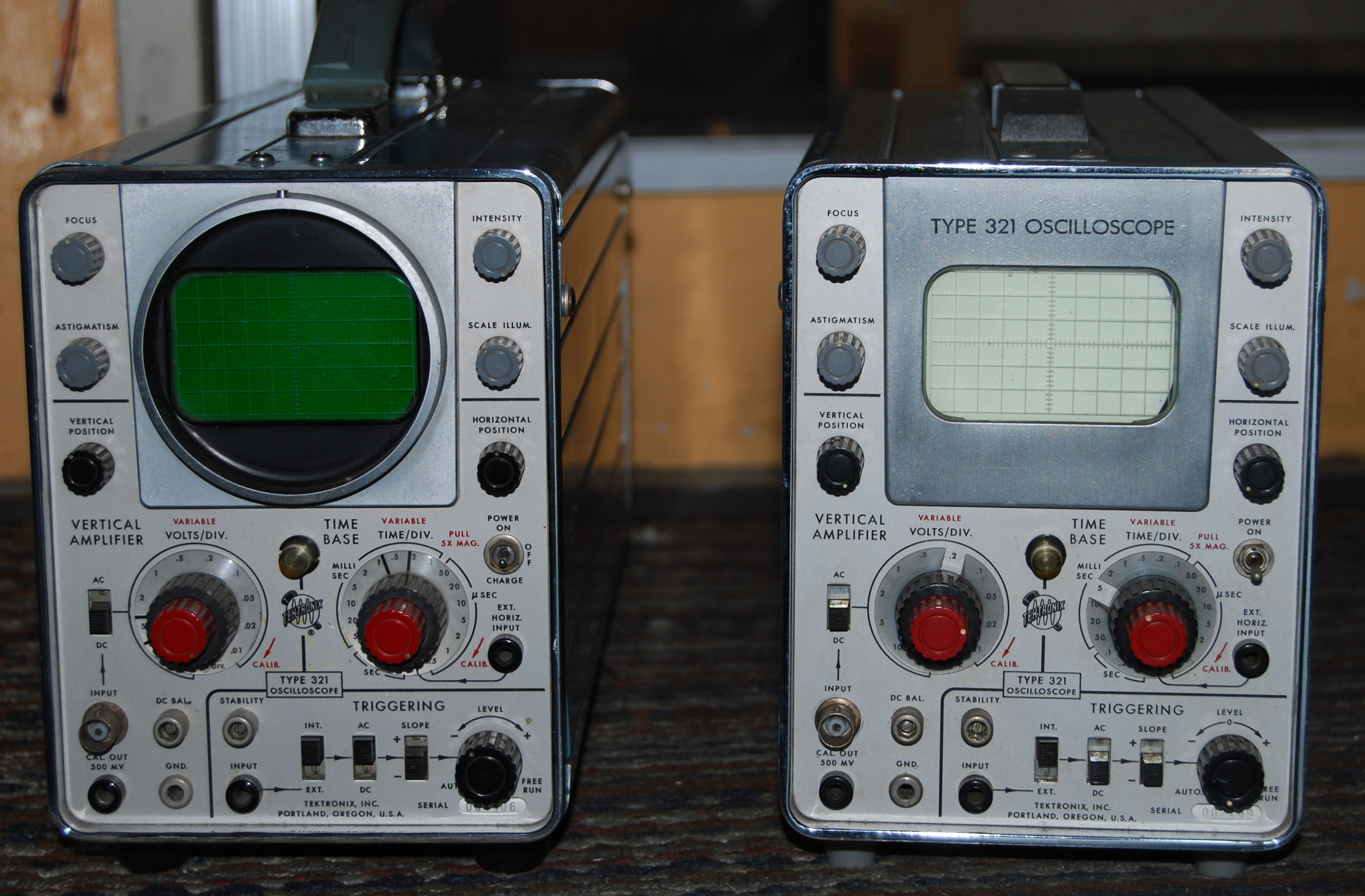
ATF Spartan used in the front panels of early 1960s Tektronix oscilloscopes.

The League of Movable Type has published a FOSS version with variable width under the name League Spartan.

== Similar fonts ==
- Drogowskaz
