= Bernhard Modern =

Modern serif typeface introduced in 1937

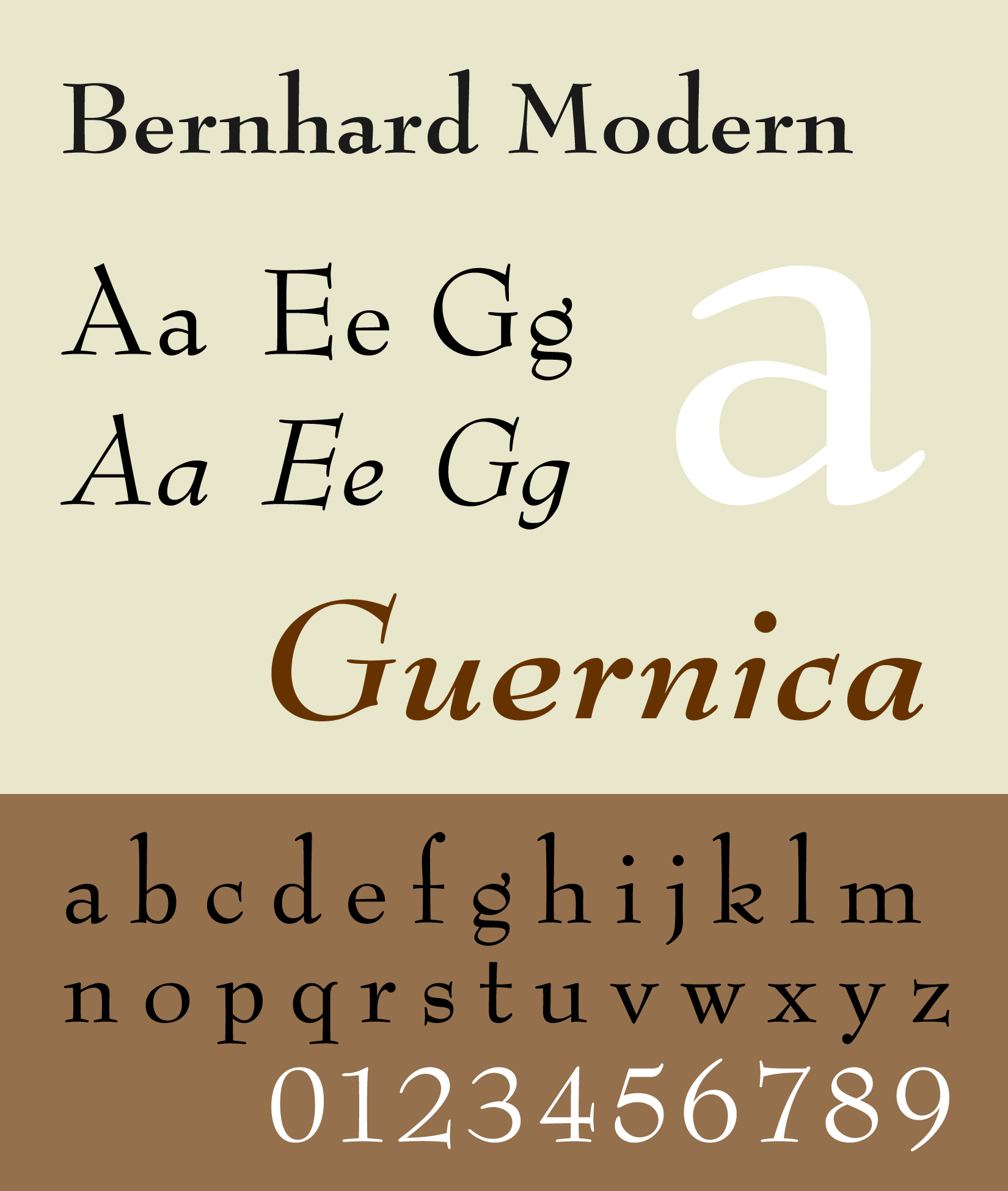
- Category: Serif
- Designer(s): Lucian Bernhard
- Foundry: ATF
- Date created: 1937

Bernhard Modern is a modern style classification serif typeface designed by Lucian Bernhard in 1937 for the American Type Founders (ATF).

Lucian Bernhard's Bernhard Modern typeface was the ATF's response to the many popular old-style engraving faces of the early 20th century. A somewhat decorative text typeface, it is distinct for its low x-height, elongated ascenders, and relatively short descenders giving it an appearance of height without requiring excessive leading. Serifs are wide and splayed. The lowercase roman g is unusual for having the upper bowl larger than the lower one.

Fordham University, in New York City, currently uses Bernhard Modern as the central typeface of its design identity. Both the 1959 version of The Twilight Zone and its 2019 revival use Bernhard Modern, with a drop shadow, for titles and credits. The 1990s computer application The Walt Disney World Explorer used Bernhard Modern extensively throughout the program. The most notable example for using Bernard Modern is The Gruffalo by Julia Donaldson and Axel Scheffler.

Judge Frank Easterbrook criticized its use for body text. AsymaDesign, LLC v. CBL & Assocs. Mgmt., Inc., 103 F.4th 1257, 1261 (7th Cir. 2024) ("We hope that Bernhard Modern has made its last appearance in an appellate brief.").
