= Eagle (typeface) =

Geometric sans-serif typeface

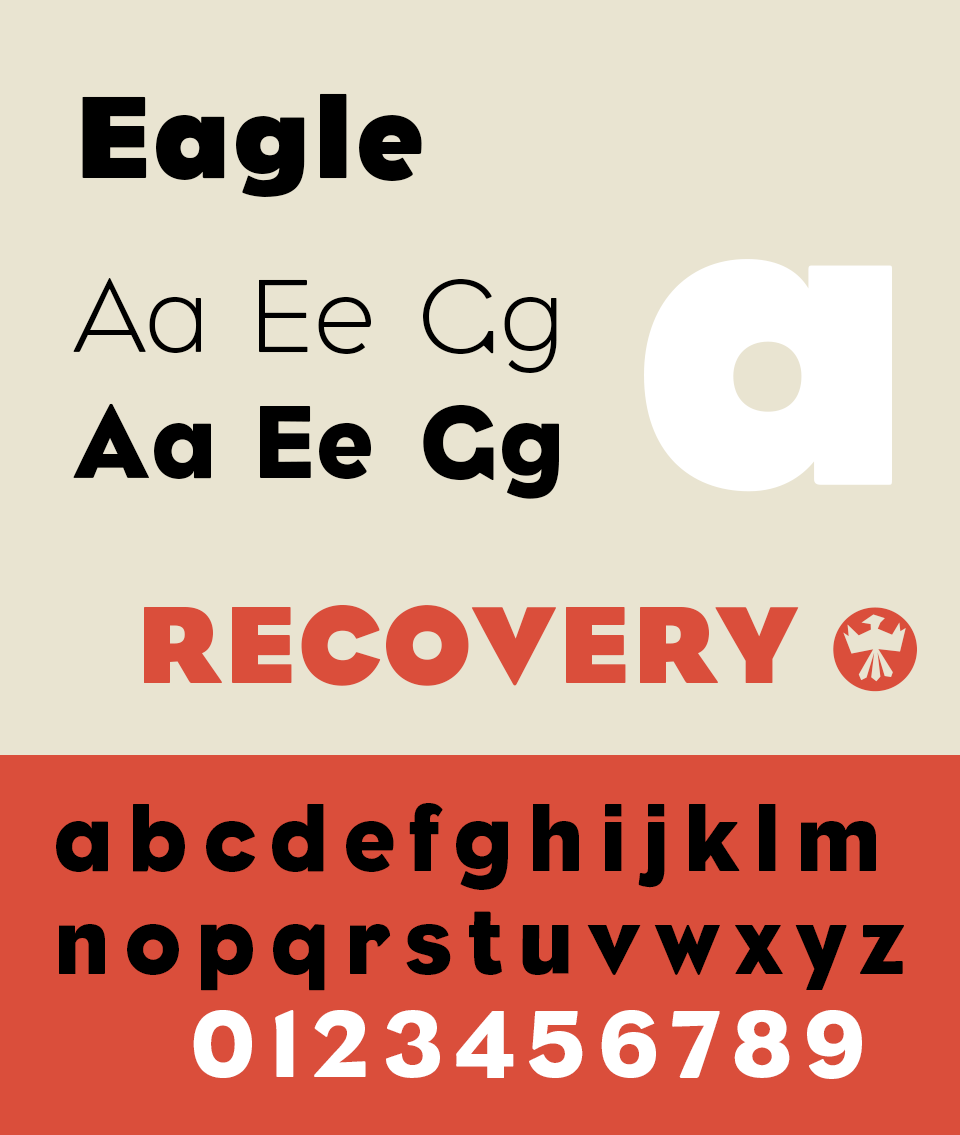
- Category: Sans-serif
- Classification: Geometric
- Designer: Morris Fuller Benton
- Commissioned by: National Recovery Association
- Foundry: American Type Founders (ATF)
- Date created: 1934
- Re-issuing foundries: Font Bureau

Eagle is a font family that is based on "Eagle Bold", introduced by American Type Founders in 1934.

== History ==
"Eagle Bold" derives from the letters "NRA," hand-lettered in a style akin to the Novel Gothic typeface, in the original design of the Blue Eagle logo of the National Recovery Administration. When the design was accepted it was found that the other letters in Novel Gothic were "too eccentric" for use on government posters, and so a new, simpler face was designed by Morris Fuller Benton, the co-designer of Novel Gothic, for use on NRA materials. Naturally, it was named for the NRA eagle. It was an all-capitals display typeface, produced by the American Type Founders Company and cast in type in sizes from 18 to 96 point, and was available at least into the 1940s.

The Font Bureau copied this font in 1989 and published lower-case letters for it. In 1990, "Eagle Book" was added to the family for starting text. "Eagle Light" and "Eagle Black" were added to the family in 1994, thus completing the series.

== Fame ==
This font family has gained fame throughout the 1930s when "Eagle Bold" became a huge hit. This font family is also used by Cartoon Network as its typeface since its founding on October 1, 1992, along with Gotham Bold on most uses such as on merchandising, and as a production and network logo.

The font was used for David Bowie's LP "Heroes".
