= Clarence P. Hornung =

American graphic designer and illustrator

US Civil Defense fallout shelter symbol, a symbol documented by and possibly drawn from Hornung's Handbook

Clarence Pearson Hornung (June 12, 1899 – January 2, 1997) was an American trademark and industrial graphic designer and illustrator.

== Biography ==
Clarence Pearson Hornung was born June 12, 1899, the son of Jules S. and Carrie Pfaelzer Hornung. He studied at City College of New York (B.S.), New York University and Cooper Union Art School in New York.

One of Hornung's well-known works is the Handbook of Designs and Devices first published in 1932. He was a designer for the American Type Founders, and created colophons for many contemporary publishers including the Book League of America, Farrar & Rinehart and Vanguard Press. He designed book bindings for clients including Encyclopædia Britannica, Harper's, the Metropolitan Museum of Art and H. Wolff.

Many famous trademarks and symbols used in the mid 20th century drew on Hornung's work, or were designed by him. During a Judge Advocate General patent division review of the then-new US Civil Defense Fallout Shelter sign, it was noted that the sign was identical to design 349 in Hornung's Handbook.

Hornung's limited edition lithographs of antique automobiles are highly desired by collectors.

In 1972 Abrams Books published Hornung's Treasury of American Design, an anthology of popular art in two volumes. New York Times art criti Hilton Kramer called it "a work of extraordinary beauty — Mr. Hornung also designed it — which is a virtual encyclopedia of American folk art … indispensable."

Clarence P. Hornung died January 2, 1997, at age 97.

== Selected bibliography ==
- 1930: Trade-Marks. New York: Caxton Press, 1930
- 1932: Handbook of Designs and Devices. New York: Dover Publications, Inc., 1932
- 1956: Handbook of Early Advertising Art, Mainly from American Sources. New York: Dover Publications, Inc., 1956 (two volumes)
- 1959: Wheels Across America. New York: A. S. Barnes & Co., 1959, ISBN 0425036340
- 1968: A Sourcebook of Antiques and Jewelry Designs. New York: George Braziller, Inc., 1968
- 1968: Portrait Gallery of Early Automobiles. New York: Harry N. Abrams, 1968
- 1972: Treasury of American Design and Antiques. New York: Harry N. Abrams, Inc., 1972 (two volumes), ISBN 0-517-25915-X
- 1974: Will Bradley: His Graphic Art. New York: Dover Publications, Inc., 1974.
- 1976: 200 Years of American Graphic Art (with Fridolf Johnson). New York: George Braziller, Inc., 1976
- 1978: The Way it Was in the U.S.A. New York: Abbeville Press, 1978
- 1991: Advertising Designs of Walter Dorwin Teague. New York: Art Direction Book Company, 1991.
