= Joseph W. Phinney =

- Born: 1848; Nantucket
- Died: 1934 (aged 85–86)
- Known for: typography

Joseph Warren Phinney (1848–1934) was an American printer, type designer, and business executive. Phinney began his career at the Dickinson Type Foundry in Boston where he designed type and worked in management, eventually becoming owner. He was a key player in arranging the merger of twenty-six large foundries to form the American Type Founders Company in 1892, becoming both manager of the Boston branch and head of the design department, where he oversaw the consolidation of type faces following the merger. Though his own designs were largely derivative, Phinney took a great interest in type and its history and throughout his tenure at A.T.F. he sought to preserve and protect that company's legacy, as for instance, when he oversaw the re-introduction of Binny & Ronaldson's 1796 type design, Roman No. 1, as Oxford in 1892, or when he purchased Frederick W. Goudy's first type design, Camelot, in 1896. He stayed with A.T.F. for the rest of his career, passing the role of design head to Morris Fuller Benton and becoming senior vice-president. Phinney retired shortly before the company fell upon hard times during the Great Depression and died in 1934.

== Typefaces designed Joseph W. Phinney ==
In addition to many faces cut for the Dickinson Type Foundry, Phinney also cut these faces cast by American Type Founders.

- Jenson Series
  - Jenson Oldstyle + italic (1893), based on William Morris's "Golden Type", matrices cut by John F. Cumming from drawings by Phinney.
  - Jenson Heavyface (1899)
  - Jenson Condensed + Bold Condensed (1901)
- Bradley Text (1895), developed from Will H. Bradley's lettering on the Christmas cover of Inland Printer Magazine by either Phinney or (more probably) Herman Ihlenberg.
- Satanick (1896), based on William Morris's Troy and Chaucer, matrices cut by John F. Cumming from drawings by Phinney.
- Taylor Gothic (1897), capitals only, lower-case based on Central Type Foundry of St. Louis' Quentell. Later re-worked by either Morris Fuller Benton or Goudy as Globe Gothic.
- Devens Script (1898)
- Touraine Oldstyle Italic (1898)
- Lower-case letters for Goudy's Camelot (1900)
- Abbott Oldstyle (1901)
- Engravers' Old English (1901), usually credited to Benton.
- Flemish Black (1902) An adaptation of Priory Text, an 1870s version of William Caslon’s Caslon Text of 1734.
- Cheltenham Oldstyle + italic (1902), developed from Bertram Goodhue's architectural lettering by either Phinney or Benton.
- Cloister Black (1904), lower-case identical to Flemish Black, capitals usually credited to Benton.
