= Thomas Maitland Cleland =

American painter (1880–1964)

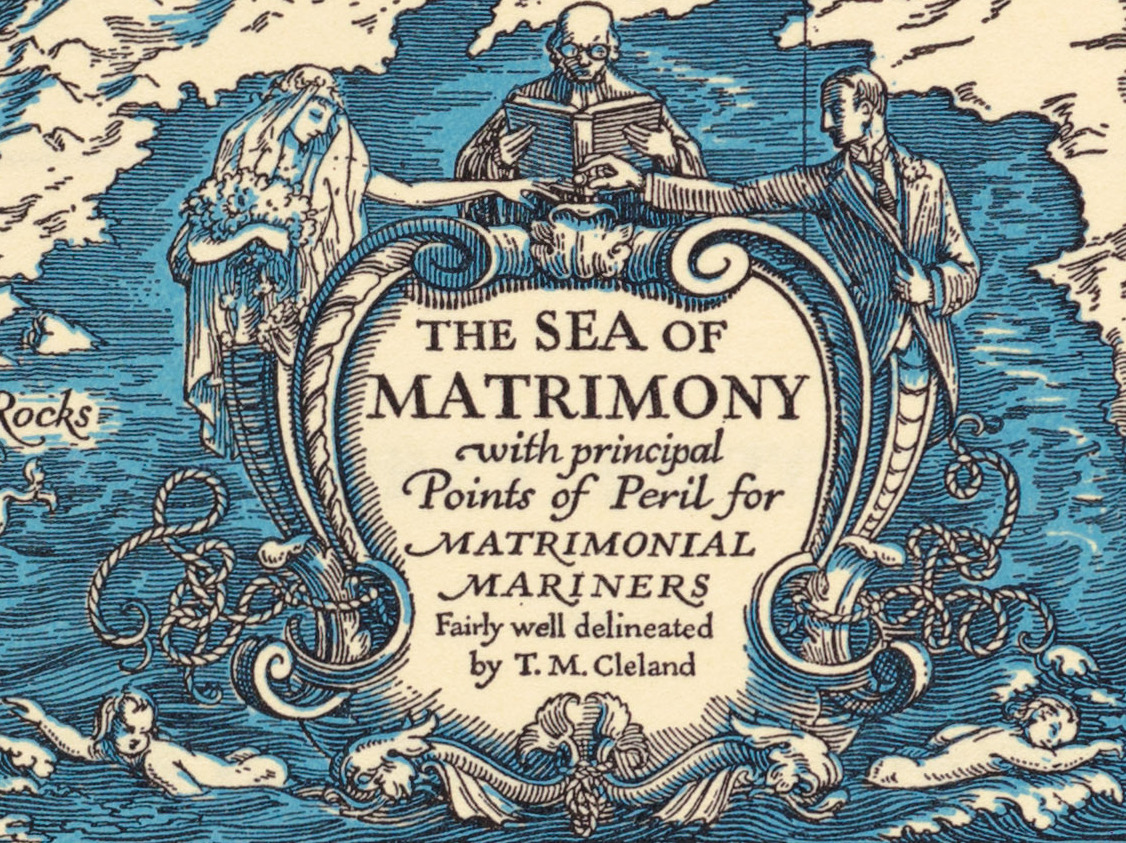
Sea of Matrimony, by Cleland

Thomas Maitland Cleland (August 18, 1880 – November 9, 1964) was an American book designer, painter, illustrator, and type designer.

== Early life and education ==
Thomas Maitland Cleland was born August 18, 1880, in Brooklyn, New York. Cleland studied at the ArtistArtisan Institute in Chelsea, New York, but was otherwise self-taught.

== Career ==
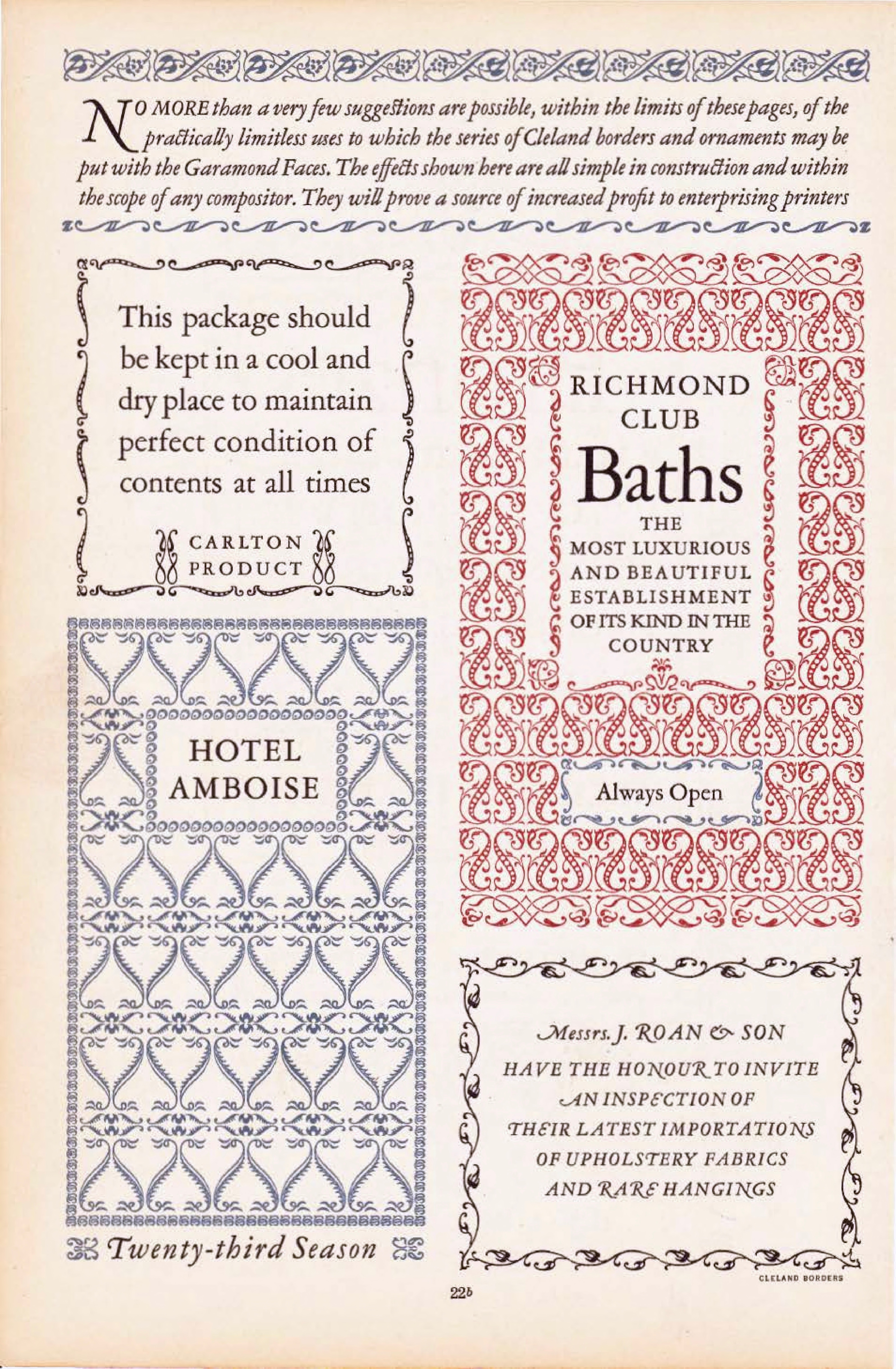
Borders designed for American Type Founders

Cleland began his career as a book designer for the Caslon Press and created title pages for Merrymount Press. Daniel Berkeley Updike of the Merrymount Press was a mentor who encouraged him to strive for perfection with commissions and criticism. When the Caslon Press folded in 1900, Cleland acquired a small foot-powered press and some fonts and launched his own printing shop from a room he constructed in his father's basement. He managed to produce two small books along with small job printing projects. His work caught the notice of printing enthusiasts in Boston, who persuaded him to move his operation there and launch the Cornhill Press.

From 1907 to 1908, Cleland was art director of McClure’s Magazine, completely redesigning the periodical during his tenure. In 1925, he created illustrations and typography for Wesvaco Paper Corporation's in-house magazine. In 1929, he was hired on as art director to design Fortune magazine by Henry Luce. The initial issue in February 1930 was hailed as a masterpiece of classical design and was pitched to Luce at the initial meeting. In 1937, he planned a typographical refresh of Newsweek. Later, he designed the newspaper PM. The design of the newspaper earned him the Ayer Award. He worked on eight books for the Limited Editions Club of The Heritage Press, designing a variety of illustrations, typography, and complete books. He also consulted printers on ink printing.

He was a member of the Architectural League of New York, the Society of Illustrators and the Century Club, and an honorary member of the Boston Society of Arts and Crafts and the American Institute of Graphic Arts and was associated with American Type Founders for most of the early twentieth century. In 1940, he won the AIGA medal for his work. In 1960, in recognition of his work the New York Public Library held an exhibition for two months. In 1978, he was inducted into the Art Directors Club Hall of Fame.

Cleland died November 9, 1964, at his Long Ridge home in Danbury, Connecticut.

== Typefaces ==
- Della Robbia (1903, ATF) later cast by Lanston Monotype (1915), Deberny & Peignot (1917) and Intertype, and cast as Westminster Oldstyle by Stephenson Blake (1907), and as Firenze by Typefoundry Amsterdam.
  - Della Robbia Light (1913, ATF) was cut by Morris Fuller Benton and copied by Damon & Peat as Armstrong.
  - Della Robbia Initials (Intertype) are not related at all.
- Garamond No. 3 + Italic (1917, ATF) in collaboration with Morris Fuller Benton
- Swash letters for Caslon Oldstyle Italic No. 471 (1920, ATF)
- Swash letters for Garamond No. 3 + Italic (1922, ATF)

== Bibliography ==
- Cleland, T.M., Giambattista Bodoni of Parma (1916)
- Cleland, T.M.; Hamill, Alfred E.; Kent, Rockwell (Illustrator), The Decorative Work of T.M. Cleland, A Record and Review, Pynson Printers, New York (1929)
