= Bank Gothic =

Geometric sans-serif typeface

- Category: Sans-serif
- Classification: Geometric
- Designer: Morris Fuller Benton
- Foundry: American Type Founders
- Date created: 1930–1933
- Re-issuing foundries: Bitstream; FontHaus; Linotype

Bank Gothic is a rectilinear geometric sans-serif typeface designed by Morris Fuller Benton for American Type Founders and released in 1930. The design has become popular from the late twentieth century to suggest a science-fiction, military, corporate, or sports aesthetic.

Bank Gothic is an exploration of geometric forms, and is contemporary with the rectilinear slab serif typeface City by Georg Trump (Gothic in this context means "sans-serif", at the time a common usage, rather than blackletter). The typeface also bears comparison with late-nineteenth-century engraving faces such as Copperplate Gothic, which were popular for business card and corporate stationery printing. The design was initially issued in small print sizes to allow this use.

== Metal type ==
The original metal typeface was capitals-only in light, medium and bold in regular and condensed widths, with larger sizes released as Poster Gothic. (Note: Linotype doesn't mention a condensed bold in their article on the family's history, but McGrew reports that it was released and shows a copy.) According to McGrew, the range of sizes cast allowed smaller sizes to be used as small capitals for larger sizes. It became a standard design, with Monotype, Linotype, Ludlow and Intertype offering versions. When Linotype issued a digitization in the 1980s, small caps were added in the lower-case position, and this has become common in digital releases.

== Digitizations ==
As American Type Founders ceased operations before issuing a digital version, various digitizations have been released by different companies, including Bitstream, ParaType (the Bitstream digitization, adding Cyrillic), and others.

=== Bank Gothic Pro ===
In 2010, FontHaus released an updated revival of the original Bank Gothic complete with a lowercase and small caps and a new suite of punctuation glyphs. The family consists of light, medium, and bold weights in both a regular and a condensed style. The new lowercase characters did not exist with the original release, and were modeled after many similar Morris Fuller Benton designs released by American Type Founders in the 1930s.

=== DeLuxe Gothic ===
In 2003, letterforms artist Michael Doret began work on DeLuxe Gothic—a derivative version of American Type Founder's Bank Gothic. Unlike the 1930s original, Doret's font contains lowercase characters. The DeLuxe Gothic Family was released in OpenType format in 2010 by Alphabet Soup Type Founders with both regular and condensed styles as well as traditional shortcaps. DeLuxe Gothic was the name originally used by the Intertype Corporation for its version of Morris Fuller Benton's Bank Gothic. Prior to its September 8, 2010 release, it was known as Bank Gothic AS.

=== Morris Sans ===
Designed by Dan Reynolds for Linotype, Morris Sans is an extended Bank Gothic family including both lowercase letters and small capitals. The design has three weights in regular and condensed widths, and modern OpenType features.

=== Squarish Sans CT ===
Squarish Sans is a typeface under development as of September 2014. It was developed specifically to address the need of open-source software having access to this popular design, and is thus under the terms of the Open Font License. It follows DeLuxe Gothic and Morris Sans in containing true lowercase characters, as well as small caps. Squarish Sans offers Greek, Hebrew, and a large number of non-alphabetic (e.g. mathematical) symbols as well.

=== Others ===
Elsner+Flake designed two typefaces which are based on the Bank Gothic typeface: Bank Sans EF and Bank Sans Caps EF. Both typefaces had 32 styles (Regular, Semi Condensed, Condensed, Compressed, Light, Regular, Medium, Bold) with italics and support Cyrillic.

Matt Desmond designed the Aldrich typeface, influenced from the Bank Gothic typeface.

Banque Gothique was designed by Steve Jackaman and published by Red Rooster Collection. Banque Gothique contains 9 styles and family package options and is based on the earliest ATF/M.F. Benton versions of the Bank Gothic typefaces.

Alex Kaczun designed the Axion RX-14 typeface, inspired from the Bank Gothic typeface.

== Notes and references ==
- Blackwell, Lewis. 20th Century Type. Yale University Press: 2004. ISBN 0-300-10073-6.
- Fiedl, Frederich, Nicholas Ott and Bernard Stein. Typography: An Encyclopedic Survey of Type Design and Techniques Through History. Black Dog & Leventhal: 1998. ISBN 1-57912-023-7.
- Jaspert, W. Pincus, W. Turner Berry and A.F. Johnson. The Encyclopedia of Type Faces. Blandford Press Lts.: 1953, 1983. ISBN 0-7137-1347-X.
