= Copperplate Gothic =

- Category: Wedge Serif
- Designer: Frederic W. Goudy
- Foundry: American Type Founders
- Date released: 1901
- Re-issuing foundries: Linotype

Copperplate Gothic is a typeface designed by Frederic W. Goudy and first produced by American Type Founders (ATF) beginning in 1901.

While termed a "Gothic" (another term for sans-serif), the face has small glyphic serifs that act to emphasize the blunt terminus of vertical and horizontal strokes. The typeface shows an unusual combination of influences; the glyphs are reminiscent of stone carving or lettering on copperplate engravings, the wide horizontal axis is typical of Victorian display types, yet the result is cleaner and leaves a crisp impression in letterpress or offset printing.

Goudy designed Copperplate Gothic in capitals only, since the design was intended to be used for headings and key words rather than for body text. It is not at all characteristic of Goudy's work, which is generally in the old-style serif genre. Goudy created it early in his career while in need of commissions, although he wrote in his 1946 autobiography that he "treasured" the drawings for their quality and noted that the design remained largely used. It was developed on the initiative of ATF manager Clarence Marder while Goudy was living in Hingham, Massachusetts. ATF later cut other versions, such as bold styles, condensed and shaded styles, but never a lower case.

The typeface is often used in stationery, for social printing and business cards. It is also classically seen acid-etched into glass on the doors of law offices, banks and restaurants.

Master printer J. L. Frazier, no great fan of sans-serif types, wrote of it in 1925 that "a certain dignity of effect accompanies...due to the absence of anything in the way of frills," making it a popular choice for the stationery of professionals such as lawyers and doctors. (Note: Typifying his views, he wrote that 'It is worthy of note that Copperplate Gothic has the tiniest of serifs...sufficient to help its appearance materially. They seem to reduce somewhat the crudity of the letter.")

== In popular culture ==
Copperplate Gothic in the logo of Racing 92, a rugby union club in Paris

The typeface was used in the logo of the game show Who Wants to Be a Millionaire? and the Universal Pictures logo from 1990 and 1997 until 2012 in various altered forms, as well as the Knowledge Adventure logo from 1993 to 1998. It was also used in the opening title sequence, end credits and on Paul Allen's business card in the 2000 film American Psycho. The typeface was also used in the 1990s for Sega's second logo for the Sega Genesis and Sega CD, as well as the logos for the 32X, Game Gear, as well as their slogan at the time, "Welcome to the Next Level." It has also been used in the logo for the drum manufacturer Craviotto Drum Company since 2004.

It has been used for the Feature Program logo on Winnie the Pooh videos distributed by Walt Disney Home Video.

Between 2010 and 2019, the typeface was featured in the uniforms and branding of the Golden State Warriors, a basketball team in San Francisco. It is also used for the logo of the California-based rock band Cake.

In the TV series Future Man, the time-traveling character Wolf references Copperplate Gothic by name. In the year 1625 he wanted to use the typeface for a pamphlet, and described it as "classic, timeless".

In "Super Sunday", season 2 episode 13 of the TV series The Middle, Brick Heck pines over the typeface used in a news article about the Super Bowl. He tells his father Mike that the font used is Copperplate Gothic, stating that it is part of the sans serif typeface family, after which he did his signature whisper to himself "sans serif".

== Related typefaces ==
The general style of Copperplate Gothic is known as wedge-serif, due to the very narrow serifs pointing outwards, or as engraving faces due to the similarity with engraved letters. Copperplate Gothic's serifs, which are much less bold than the letters, are small by the standards of the genre. The wedge-serif style is sometimes called Latin, especially in Europe, and was quite popular there for much of the twentieth century. For example, Adrian Frutiger's early design Initiales Président (1952) was intended to be a French competitor; Frutiger in his autobiography noted that they were for makers of type "one of the safest investments. Smaller printers in particular had a steady demand for them." His later Méridien (also called Frutiger Serif) is a text face with some similarities, although this has more normal-sized serifs and a true lower-case.
