= Wadsworth A. Parker =

- Born: 1864
- Died: 1938 (aged 73–74); Petersburg, Virginia, US
- Known for: typography

Wadsworth A. Parker (1864 – 1938) was an American printer and typeface designer. He was a director of the American Type Founders Company, designed many faces for them, and served as head of their specimen department. His faces are typically highly decorative and often capture the Art Deco style of the time.

== Typefaces designed Wadsworth A. Parker ==
All faces cut by American Type Founders.

- Goudy Handtooled + italic (1922), alternately credited to either Charles H. Becker or Morris Fuller Benton.
- Lexington (1926), with Clarence P. Hornung.
- Gallia (1927)
- Modernistic (1928)
- Graybar (1930)
- Additions to M.F. Bentons's Stymie series:
  - Stymie Compressed (1932)
  - Stymie Inline Title (1932)
- Swash letters for Bookman (1936?)
