= Tower (typeface) =

Slab serif typeface

Constructa, a copy of Tower by Elizabeth Cory Holzman from the original design by Morris Fuller Benton. It is licensed by Font Bureau.

Tower was a slab serif typeface designed by Morris Fuller Benton for American Type Founders and based upon his earlier design for Stymie, but with straight sides to the round letters emphasizing the vertical appearance. Tower Italic was designed but not cast. In 1936, Tower Bold was started by the same designer, but was instead made into Stymie Bold Condensed.

== Digital type ==
Tower was digitized as Constructa by Elizabeth Cory Holzman for Font Bureau. Holzman's revival includes a light weight called Constructa Thin and an extra bold called Constructa Black.
