= Hobo (typeface) =

Display sans-serif typeface

- Category: Sans-serif
- Classification: Display
- Designer: Morris Fuller Benton
- Foundry: American Type Founders
- Date released: 1910; 116 years ago
- Re-issuing foundries: Intertype
- Trademark: 1915

Hobo is a sans-serif typeface. It is known for having no straight lines or descenders. It was created by Morris Fuller Benton and issued by American Type Founders in 1910. A light version, Light Hobo, was released in 1915. Matrices were offered for mechanical composition by Intertype. The lower case letters provided the basis for Robert Wiebking's Advertisers Gothic of 1917.

This font may have originally been intended as an Art-Nouveau font due to its resemblance to other fonts of the time.

There are several theories regarding the font's name, and in fact it is widely recognized as one of the more interesting mysteries in typographic history. One theory states that its name came from a story stating that it was sketched in the early 1900s, sent to the foundry nameless, and progressed so little for so long, that it was called "that old hobo". Hobo, originally called Adface, was finally patented in 1915 along with Light Hobo. The prevailing bow-legged shape of the letterforms inspired another long-held theory that it was so named because they resembled those of a bow-legged hobo.

The most complete theory, proposed in 2014, was also found to be implausible. The proposal demonstrated how Benton (who lived and worked near a large Russian community) may have seen a particular cigar poster spelling what appears to read like "HOBO!" ("ново", Russian for "new", pronounced as novo). Aside from the coincidence of the word at the top, the poster's hand-lettering of an "O" bears a total resemblance to that of the font. However, in 2026, Stephen Coles discovered that the poster's damaged corner had apparently been retouched and the "O" inserted later.

In 2024, the author of the Russian poster theory found that the Colgate cosmetics company had already been using hand-lettered and/or movable type forms virtually identical to the Hobo design as early as 1906. This was four years before the ATF font was published. It was employed widely in Colgate's product packaging as well as magazine advertisements, and the company continued to use this design throughout the war years and well into the 1920s. Therefore, the greatest likelihood is that Benton either imitated the Colgate font without permission or had been commissioned by Colgate to redraw and cut the font. The choice of name remains a mystery.

== Usage in popular culture ==
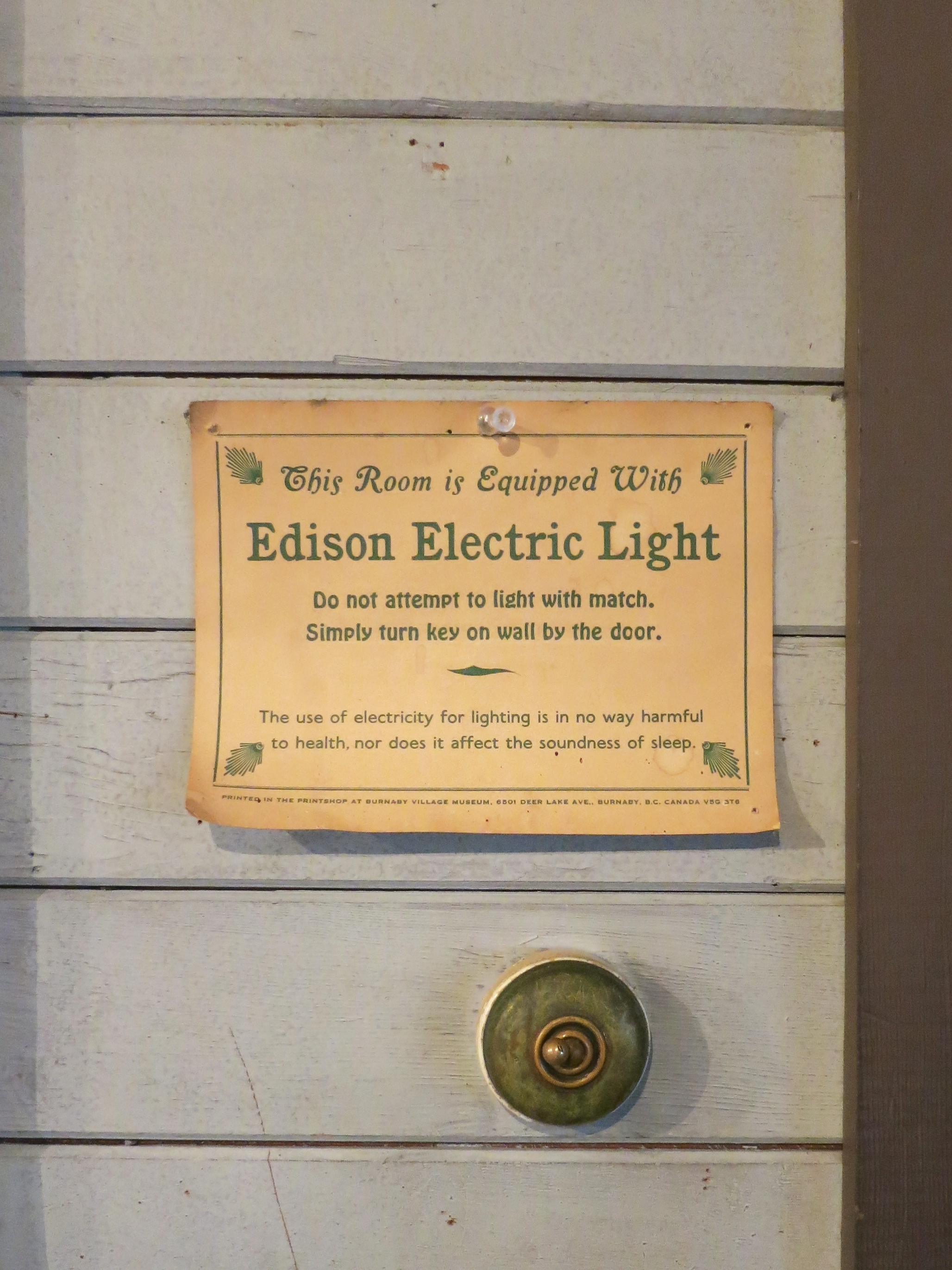
"Do not attempt to light with match" is in Hobo. Modern reprinting using old type, in a museum.

Hobo was used as the main typeface in the title sequence and promotional materials of the 1969 film Butch Cassidy and the Sundance Kid.

Hobo was used in the opening titles of The Dukes of Hazzard.

Hobo was used as the main typeface in the title card sequence of Winx Club.

Hobo was used as the long closing credits of Tic-Tac-Dough.

Around the sixth generation of video game consoles, Hobo was used in the Spyro franchise, as seen in The Legend of Spyro: A New Beginning and The Legend of Spyro: The Eternal Night, and for the logo of several Frogger subseries, including Frogger: The Great Quest and Frogger's Adventures: The Rescue.

Hobo was used as the opening and ending credits of the popular television show That '70s Show.

The words "TROPICANA FIELD" appear in Hobo typeface on the side of Tropicana Field, a multipurpose stadium located in St. Petersburg, Florida, United States. It has been described as "a bygone font for a bygone edifice."

Hobo was used in Pantages Theatre's logo.

Hobo was used in the logo of Ubu Productions from 1982-2002.

Hobo also gets used in the Bon Appétit test kitchen videos.

Hobo was used in "Signing Time!".

Hobo was used in the ending credits of Polka Dot Door (sometimes).

Hobo was used in the opening and ending credits of Czech stop motion series Pat & Mat (episodes from 2002-2004).

Hobo was used on the back cover of American experimental hip hop group Death Grips's 2018 album Year of the Snitch.

Hobo was used in some videos of the YouTube channel EdukayFUN, which joined the site on October 9, 2014, and terminated in 2019, but still uploading videos as EdukayFUN 2.0, with the first video using the font being "Johnny Johnny, Yes Papa".

Hobo is used for the dialogue of some characters in Madness: Project Nexus.

Hobo can be seen on the Dirt Cheap logo.
