= Linn Boyd Benton =

American typographer

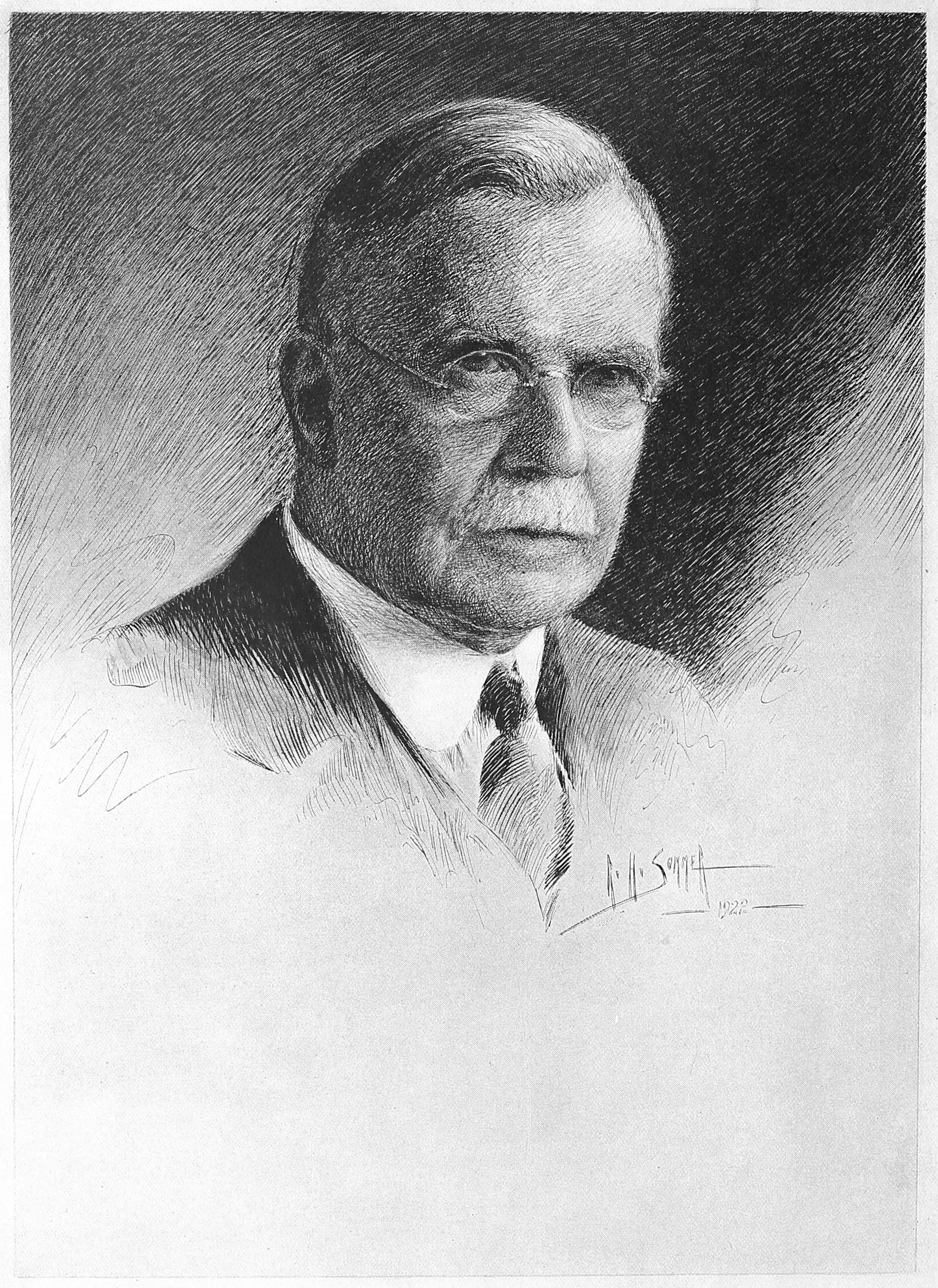
Portrait of Linn Boyd Benton by R. H. Sommer

Linn Boyd Benton (1844 in Little Falls, New York – 1932 in Plainfield, New Jersey) was an American typeface designer and inventor of technology for producing metal type.

The son of Congressman Charles S. Benton, he was named for his father's friend Linn Boyd. After starting a career as a book-keeper and working at two newspapers, he became joint owner of Benton, Waldo & Co. Type Foundry and rapidly developed a thorough understanding of typefounding methods that led him to develop new technologies. An 1886 profile described him as "an intelligent, entertaining, unostentatious gentleman, a mechanical genius". Benton's company was one of the original group of companies that merged to form the American Type Founders Company (ATF) in 1892, after which he was a director and chief consultant to ATF.

Benton invented many of the most important type founding technologies of the day, including a mould (1882), self spacing type (1883), a punch cutter (1885), combination fractions (1895), a type dressing machine (1901), a matrix and punch-cutting machine (1906), and automatic type-caster (1907), and a lining device for engraving matrices of shaded letters (1913). One of his most famous inventions was the Benton Pantograph, an engraving machine which not only was capable of scaling a single font design pattern to a variety of sizes, but could also condense, extend, and slant the design. (Mathematically, these are cases of affine transformation, which is the fundamental geometric operation of most systems of digital typography today, including PostScript.) The technology allowed metal type to be designed on large plan drawings and then cut at the desired size, rather than being hand-engraved at the desired size.

In 1894, at the commission of the publisher of the Century Magazine, Theodore Low De Vinne, he designed his most famous typeface, the original Century. De Vinne wanted a blacker and more legible face than the typically thin type used before, and slightly condensed to fit the double-column format of the magazine. It was first used in 1895 and soon became enormously popular and many variations were later designed by his son Morris Fuller Benton.

== Typefaces ==
- Century Roman (1894, ATF)
- Century Roman Italic (1894, ATF)
