= Morris Fuller Benton =

American typeface designer (1872–1948)

- Born: November 30, 1872; Milwaukee, Wisconsin, U.S.
- Died: June 30, 1948 (aged 75); Morristown, New Jersey, U.S.
- Education: Cornell University
- Occupations: Type designer, business executive
- Employer: American Type Founders
- Spouses: Mary Ethel Bottum (died 1920) Katrina Ten Eck Wheeler (m. 1923)
- Relatives: Linn Boyd Benton

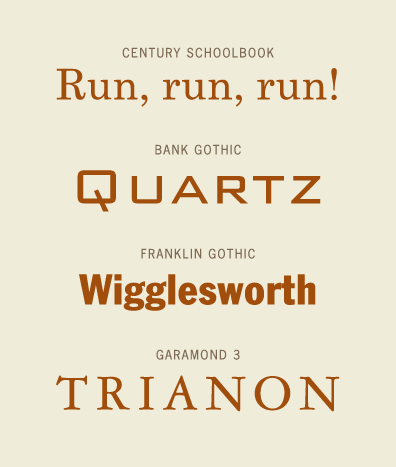
Specimens of typefaces by Morris Fuller Benton.

Morris Fuller Benton (November 30, 1872 – June 30, 1948) was an American typeface designer who headed the design department of the American Type Founders (ATF), for which he was the chief type designer from 1900 to 1937.

Many of Benton's designs, such as his large family of related sans-serif or "gothic" typefaces, including Alternate Gothic, Franklin Gothic, and News Gothic, are still in everyday use.

== Typefaces ==
Benton is credited as America's most prolific designer of metal type, having (with his team) completed 221 typefaces, including revivals of historical models, like Bodoni and Cloister; original designs, such as Hobo, Bank Gothic, and Broadway; and adding new weights to existing faces, such as Century, Goudy Old Style and Cheltenham. Although he did not invent the concept, Benton working at ATF pioneered the concept of families of typeface designs, allowing consistency of appearance in different sizes, widths and weights. This allowed ATF to capitalise on a successful typeface's popularity and facilitated coherent layout and graphic design; its 1923 specimen book described its approach of creating families which could allow advertisers to "talk at command with varying emphasis and orchestral power [rather than using] a medley of display types."

Benton worked as the team leader of designers responsible for creating a basic design and then adapting it to different sizes and weights. He considered his work as a designer important and wrote a brief list of typefaces he considered his most important work in 1936, shortly before his retirement. Benton was relatively retiring in life: a 1936 interview described him as "one of the most difficult men to interview I have ever talked to...try to pin some honour on him, or give him credit for some achievement, and he will modestly sidestep with the remark that 'Lady Luck helped me a lot there!'"

Research on Benton includes Patricia Cost's 1986 study of the Benton father-and-son contributions to type-founding and typesetting technology, and Juliet Shen's 2006 master's dissertation which re-catalogued his typefaces and analyzed his design approach, later published in a limited letterpress edition.

== Technology ==
In addition to his strong aesthetic design sense, Benton was a master of the technology of his day. He read mechanical engineering at Cornell University, graduating in 1896. His father, Linn Boyd Benton, invented the pantographic engraving machine, which was capable not only of scaling a single font design pattern to a variety of sizes while compensating for the size change, but could also condense, extend, and slant the design (mathematically, these are cases of affine transformation, which is the fundamental geometric operation of most systems of digital typography today, including PostScript). Morris used these machines with his father at ATF, during which these machines were refined to an impressive level of precision.

Theo Rehak, the current owner of much ATF typecasting equipment, and author of the definitive treatise Practical Typecasting, explains that the Bentons demanded that any deviation in machining or casting be within two ten-thousandths of an inch. Most modern machine shops are equipped to measure down to one thousandth of an inch. As an advertising device, in 1922 ATF manufactured a piece of type eight points tall (0.11 inch) containing the entire Lord's Prayer in 13 lines of text, using a cutting tool roughly equivalent to a 2000-dpi printer.
