= American Type Founders =

American typography company

American Type Founders Co.
- Type: Defunct
- Industry: Type foundry
- Founded: February 8, 1892; 134 years ago
- Defunct: 1993; 33 years ago
- Headquarters: Elizabeth, New Jersey, U.S.
- Key people: Linn Boyd Benton, Morris Fuller Benton, Joseph W. Phinney, Wadsworth A. Parker

American Type Founders (ATF) Co. was a business trust created in 1892 by the merger of 23 type foundries, representing about 85 percent of all type manufactured in the United States at the time. The new company, consisting of a consolidation of firms from throughout the United States, was incorporated in New Jersey.

The American Type Founders Co. should not be confused with the American Type Founders' Association, also called the Type Founders' Association of the United States. Both institutions are identified by the same acronym, ATF. The ATF Association was formed in 1864 and was responsible for establishing the American point system in 1886 based on 83 picas exactly equal to 35 cm. The ATF Co. was not formed until 1892. All but six of the 23 foundries in the company were members of the ATF Association.

The American Type Founders Co. was the dominant American manufacturer of metal type from its creation in 1892 until at least the 1940s; it continued to be influential into the 1960s. Many fonts developed by the ATF Co. in its period of dominance, including News Gothic, Century Schoolbook, Franklin Gothic, Hobo and Bank Gothic, remain in everyday use.

== Type founding before the ATF Co. ==
By the beginning of the final decade of the nineteenth century, type founding was in a state of crisis. With the introduction of the Linotype, which could cast whole lines of body type in house, demand for hand-set type was in decline. Throughout the late 1880s, prices had been maintained by an informal cartel of foundries, but as the number of foundries increased, prices dropped dramatically, a trend accelerated by the invention of hot metal typesetting. Additionally, type at this time was not standardized, either to body size or to base line, and printers resented the incompatibility of types from different foundries. Leaders in the industry, notably Joseph W. Phinney of the Dickinson Type Foundry in Boston, set up a committee to address these problems, eventually recommending consolidation.

== Consolidation and early years ==
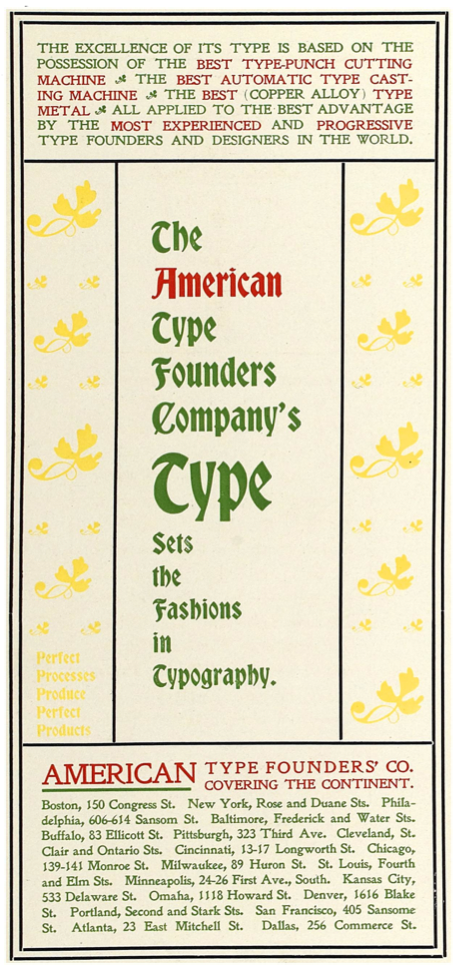
1896 advertisement in Will H. Bradley's magazine, Bradley, His Book

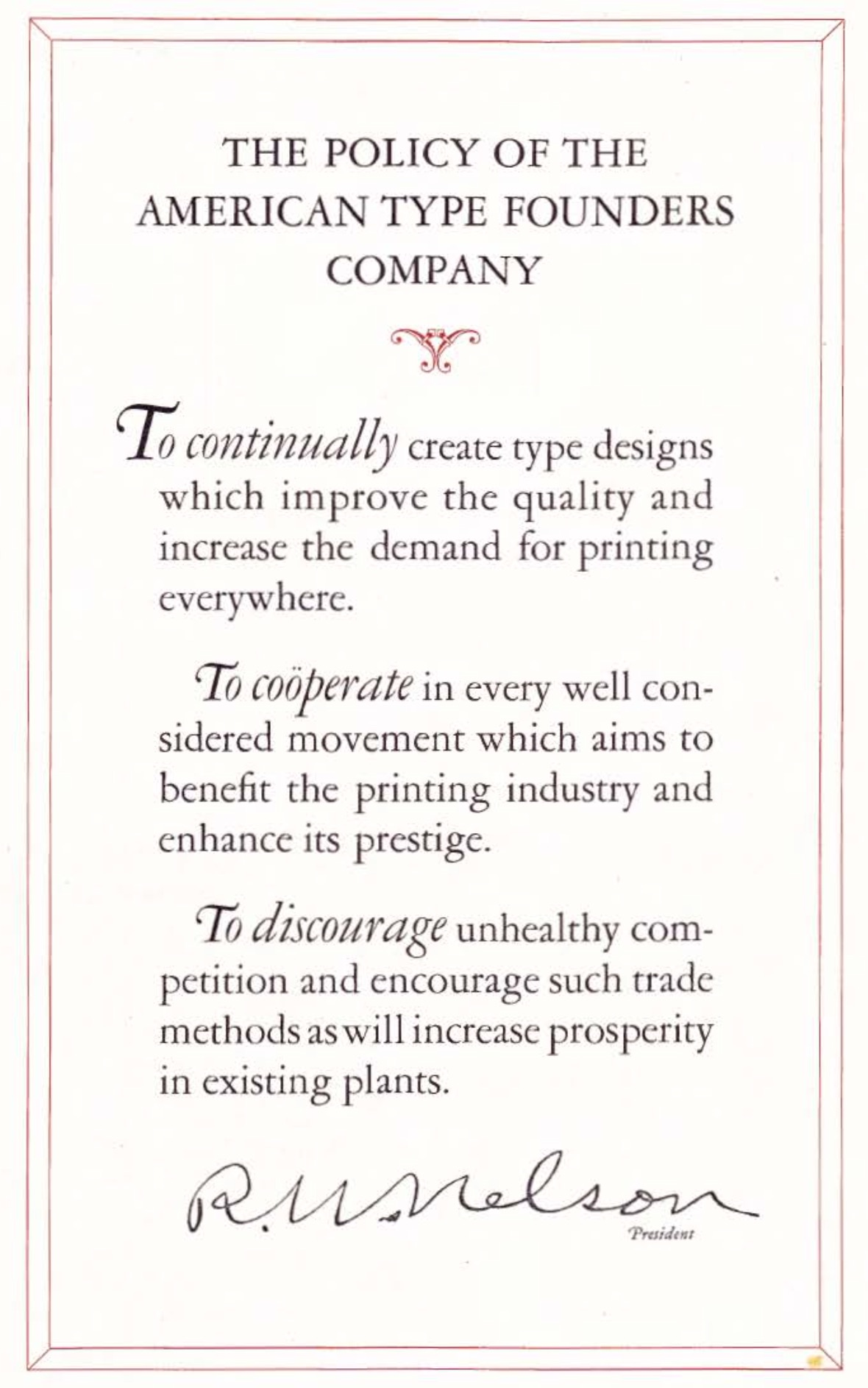
ATF's 1923 specimen book explains that its goal is to 'discourage unhealthy competition' in the printing industry.

By the late 1880s, there were some 34 foundries in the United States. In 1892, 23 foundries were brought together to form the American Type Founders Company. The Chicago Tribune (February 12, 1892) listed the 23 foundries as:

- MacKellar, Smiths, & Jordan, Co. (Philadelphia),
- Collins & M’Leester (Philadelphia),
- Pelouse & Co. (Philadelphia),
- James Conner's Sons (New York City),
- P. A. Heinrich (New York City),
- A. W. Lindsay (New York City),
- Charles J. Carey & Co. (Baltimore),
- John Ryan Co. (Baltimore),
- J. G. Mengel & Co. (Baltimore),
- Hooper, Wilson & Co. (Baltimore),
- Boston Type Foundry (Boston),
- Phelps, Dalton & Co. (Boston),
- Lyman & Son (Buffalo),
- Allison & Smith (Cincinnati),
- Cincinnati Type Foundry (Cincinnati),
- Cleveland Type Foundry (Cleveland),
- Marder, Luse, & Co. (Chicago),
- Union Type Foundry (Chicago),
- Benton, Waldo & Co. (Milwaukee),
- Central Type Foundry (St. Louis),
- St. Louis Type Foundry (St. Louis),
- Kansas City Type Foundry (Kansas City), and
- Palmer & Rey (San Francisco).

Other foundries joined later. The key to the success of this merger was the inclusion of MacKellar, Smiths, & Jordan Co. of Philadelphia, with assets of over $6 million, the Cincinnati Type Foundry of Henry Barth, which brought with it the patents to his Barth Typecaster, and Benton, Waldo Foundry of Milwaukee, which included Linn Boyd Benton and his all-important Benton Pantograph which engraved type matrices directly instead of using punches and allowed the optical scaling of type. With the inclusion of the Barth Caster and the Benton Pantograph, ATF immediately became the largest and the most technologically advanced foundry in the world.

Conditions for the first few years were chaotic: while 12 foundries ceased separate operations immediately member foundries continued to operate as if they were independent firms. Real consolidation did not begin until 1894, when Robert Wickham Nelson, principal owner of the Throne Typesetting Machine Company and a new stockholder in ATF, became general manager. He immediately began to liquidate unprofitable ventures, eliminate duplications, and force the various branches to do business under the ATF name instead of retaining their former ones. Linn Boyd Benton's son, Morris Fuller Benton, was given the job of purging obsolete and duplicated type faces from the catalogs, and standardizing the point size and baseline of the types made. Nelson, realizing that display and advertising type (rather than the body type that was set so efficiently by the new line-casters) would be the mainstay of the foundry type business, immediately began an extensive advertising campaign and commissioned the production of new type designs. Joseph W. Phinney was put in charge of the design department and he supervised the introduction of Cushing, Howland, Bradley, and the William Morris-inspired Satanick and Jenson Oldstyle, the last of these being hugely successful. Young Benton was then commissioned to finish Lewis Buddy's Elbert Hubbard-inspired Roycroft, another successful introduction.

While Phinney often used freelance designers, like Will Bradley, T.M. Cleland, Walter Dorwin Teague, Frederic Goudy, and Oz Cooper, the bulk of ATF's catalog through the 1930s was developed in-house, under the direction of Morris Fuller Benton. Under Benton's direction, the company embarked on a program of developing historical revivals, including ATF's versions of Bodoni and Garamond, as well as the development of new typefaces such as Century and (most successfully) Cheltenham, which for the first time were organized systematically into "type families" with a schedule of styles such as weight or width.

Another key player at the ATF Co. at this time was the advertising manager (and informal company historian) Henry Lewis Bullen, who in 1908 began assembling a library of historical typography and type specimen books for designers to draw upon. This collection was turned over to Columbia University's Rare Book and Manuscript Library in 1936, and acquired by the university in 1941. The books form the core of the book arts collection at Columbia. There is also an archive of ATF materials in Columbia's special collections.

In 1901, Nelson consolidated casting operations in a purpose-built factory in Jersey City and the branches remained only as distribution centers. By the 1920s, ATF had offices in 27 American cities and Vancouver, British Columbia, where it sold not only type, but pressroom supplies and printing presses (their own Kelly line and those of other manufacturers) as well. It printed large specimen books, with many examples of good layout as examples for the advertising market. In 1923, at a cost of $300,000, ATF produced its largest and most superlative type catalog. Sixty thousand of these opulent books, printed extensively in color, were distributed, and to this day they are considered to be masterpieces of the art of letterpress printing. The first paragraph of its preface boasted:

The printing of 1923 is greatly superior to that of 1900. It has better style, more attractiveness and greater power and dignity...This great improvement has not come to pass without direction. There has been, in fact, very deliberate direction. There has been constant and forward thinking on behalf of the printing industry by the American Type Founders Company, which has a well defined policy with regard to the types it is making and has been making during the last quarter century. In what position, may we ask, would the printing industry be to-day without the great type families, known to fame as Cheltenham, Century [long list follows] and others? Are there anywhere any other type families? Would not your typography be barren in appearance and much less profitable to the advertisers if these great type designs had not been developed? There can be but one answer.

By the time Nelson died in 1926, the ATF Co. seemed to be on the path to permanent profitability.

Nelson's successor as president, Frank Belknap Berry (originally one of the founders of the Cleveland Type Foundry), was unpopular with the board and he was soon replaced by Joseph F. Gillick, whose first move was to shut down ATF's subsidiary Barnhard Brothers & Spindler in Chicago and bring their casting operations to Jersey City. Though the years immediately after Nelson's passing were disappointing, 1929 was the most profitable in ATF history.

== Letterpress manufacturing ==
From 1914 to 1959 ATF manufactured letterpresses. During the 1920s and 1930s they also sold presses made by Chandler & Price, Laureate, and Thomson National Company.

=== Kelly Presses ===
When William M. Kelly (1869–1949), an employee in the sales department, proposed a design of automatic cylinder press, Nelson immediately authorized the project. The Kelly Style B Press, a three-roller, two-revolution, flat-bed cylinder press with automatic feeder and jogger was introduced in 1914 to great success. By 1923 more than 2,500 Kelly Presses had been sold and the next year production was shifted from Jersey City to a large new factory in Elizabeth, New Jersey. Several models were developed and, by 1949, more than 11,000 Kelly presses had been sold.

- Kelly Series B, 17 × 22" press sheet, produced 1914–1937
- Kelly Model #2, 22 × 34" press sheet, introduced in 1921
- Kelly Automatic Jobber, 13 × 19.5" press sheet, introduced in 1923
- Kelly Series A ("Baby Kelly"), 13.5 × 22" press sheet, introduced in 1925
- Kelly Model #1, 22 × 28" press sheet, introduced in 1929
- Kelly Series C, 17 × 22" press sheet, produced 1937–1954 (1959 UK)
- Kelly Clipper ("the Pressman's Press"), 14 × 20" press sheet, produced 1938–1941
- Kelly Model #3, 25 × 38" press sheet, produced 1949–1954 (1959 UK)

Production of Kelly presses ceased at ATF in 1954, though Vickers continued to produce two models in England until 1959.

=== Golding Press Division ===
In 1918 Golding & Company, a type foundry that also manufactured the Pearl line of letterpress, was acquired by ATF. These presses continued to be made and sold by the Golding Press Division of ATF until 1927, when the division was sold off to Thomson National Company.

=== Klymax Feeder ===
In addition to selling presses made by Chandler & Price, ATF produced the Klymax Feeder, which turned C&P's hand-fed Gordon jobber press into an automatically fed press. As such presses were ubiquitous, sales of this feeder were robust throughout the 1920s.

=== Little Giant ===
In the post-war years, ATF produced the Little Giant Automatic Cylinder Press, a smaller (12" x 18" sheet size), more compact press of much more modern design than the Kelly presses. Production of this press ceased in 1959.

== Depression and bankruptcy ==
Unfortunately for ATF, unlike printing consumables (like paper and ink), which must be purchased anew for each job, type wears slowly and its purchase can be postponed in hard times, while capital investment in new presses simply dries up, and so ATF was especially hard hit by the Depression. Also, the company had been over-extended in the boom years, too much credit had been extended to the trade, inventories were bloated, and the corps of executives (many left over from pre-consolidation days) were older and without vision. With the financial downturn after 1929 ATF began to see serious distress. In 1931 hours were cut at the factories. The following year, sales were down another 25% and salaries were cut. When major accounting errors showed the company to be even less profitable than was thought, Gillick was forced to resign.

Thomas Roy Jones, a businessman with no experience in type founding, replaced Gillick. By 1933 the situation was desperate. Sales of type were less than 30% of 1926 levels while purchases of Kelly presses had plummeted to a mere 6.8% of what they had been. In October 1933 Jones filed a voluntary petition for bankruptcy. ATF was placed under the control of its creditors (chiefly consisting of several banks) and drastic measures were taken. Operations were consolidated, the Jersey City plant was closed and the typecasting operations moved to the Kelly plant in Elizabeth. Salesmen were put on a commission basis. Inventories were cut, faces discontinued, and production of several models of Kelly press as well as the Klymax Feeder was shut down. ATF was released from court supervision in 1936, and in 1938 a sales study was made making the following observations: the Kelly press was obsolete, body type was now the exclusive province of line-casters and display type would have to be the mainstay of type production, almost half of what ATF was selling was other manufacturers' products that could easily be made in their own facilities, the acquisition of or merger with another firm in the letterpress industry would be desirable, as offset was a rising technology ATF needed to invest in that business.

== Offset presses ==
In 1938, ATF purchased the Webendorfer-Wills Company and began producing their models of offset press. ATF sold these presses under the Chief name, marketing a Little Chief, Chief, and Big Chief. Large press (as opposed to duplicator) production continued until the late 1970s when the 25" Profiteer was discontinued as the basic Webendorfer design became obsolete. Once again, ATF had made the mistake they had with the Kelly press of complacently taking profits from a successful product, not investing in improvements, and eventually seeing this product become irretrievably overtaken by the competition. Beginning in the 1970s, arrangements to sell large offset presses under the Chief name were made with other manufacturers, first with MAN Roland and then with Solna.

== War work and postwar direction ==
During the Second World War, the ATF plant in Elizabeth was converted almost entirely over to military production. Barth Casters were used to make firing pins and ATF operated two plants in Newark making ordnance.

After the war, ill-conceived efforts were made to diversify. A furniture manufacturer, Dystrom Corporation, was acquired. A competitor, Lanston Monotype, was purchased in 1969, but nothing came of this, the assets being sold off later to M&H Typefounders.

The decline of foundry type in this period might well be illustrated by the size of ATF specimen books. While the magnificent 1923 catalog was typical of its day at 1148 pages, subsequent editions were ever smaller. The 1934 catalog was only 207 pages, while the 1941 catalog was only slightly smaller at 191 pages. By 1956 the "descriptive index of types" was down to only 24 pages, but this recovered a little by 1966's catalog of 30 pages. The last ATF catalog, published in 1976 and distributed right to the end, was down to only 14 pages and, by the 1980s, came with an insert listing the faces that were no longer available.

In 1965, the lettering artist Charles H. Hughes was hired to produce a new version of the Century Type that would reproduce the same in offset and letterpress and the result was the Century Nova font. ATF also produced the first optically scanning typeface, OCR-A, in 1969, which would remain a standard on printed bank checks into the 2020s.

== Photocomposition ==
A venture was made into photocomposition with the ATF Typesetter. Introduced in 1958, the first model was the "A". Not many were produced because the character fit left much to be desired. The most common model was the "B". Character fit was improved by expanding the Friden Flexowriter "Justowriter" escape mechanism to seven units. The first seven-unit typeface designed for the ATF Typesetter was a version of Baskerville by Tommy Thompson. The last and most advanced model based on the Friden mechanism was the "B-8", where an 18-increment system, was achieved by means of a series of electro-mechanical relays that could add one or two increments which were one-third of a unit to selected characters, without changing the basic mechanical escape mechanism of the model "B", except that it was scaled back to six units. This achieved an 18-unit system like that of the Monotype, but a single unit was called an "increment", while a group of three units was called a "unit" because those were the units dealt with in the Justowriter mechanism which previous models of the ATF Typesetter used exclusively.

ATF also was the authorized sales agent in the United States and several other countries for another film setting machine, the Hadego, which was a headliner, manufactured in the Netherlands from 1951, under license from its inventor, Hans de Goeij.

The last phototypesetter designed and produced by ATF was the Photocomp 20, so named because of its rated speed of twenty 11-pica newspaper lines per minute. It featured four stepper motors (1) to move the film across, (2) to move the type disk, (3) to advance the film to the next line, and (4) to set the size of one unit of escapement. Type disks contained four fonts, each including 17 pi characters. Its controller was the first ATF controller utilizing integrated circuits in place of relays. Circuitry was based on Motorola DTL integrated circuits. Machine styling of the Photocomp 20 was by Richard Arbib. Only 17 machines were sold: one in Vienna Austria, and the remainder in North America.

ATF produced type disks with all their popular type faces. These disks were concentric rings of fonts on a transparent plastic material in negative form. Usually these disks contained roman, italic and bold versions of the same face. There was even a disk with the only Canadian type design at the time, called "Cartier". The ATF Phototypesetter was sold worldwide—in Canada, Germany, Italy, Denmark, France, Belgium, England, etc. In Denmark, several newspapers were produced on ATF Phototypesetters by a company named "Reprodan". As technology improved, ATF failed to keep pace and eventually the line was discontinued.

== Duplicators ==
In the mid-1950s the small offset (duplicator) market was dominated by Addressograph-Multilith's Multi-1250 almost without competition. A study undertaken by Whitin Machine Works, a manufacturer of textile making machinery looking to expand out of an industry depressed by the introduction of synthetic fabrics, suggested that "quick printing" done with duplicators was a growing market. Whitin thus acquired ATF in 1957, began to manufacture a small (10 x 15" sheet size) duplicator at their Whitinsville, Massachusetts facility, and to market this under the name ATF Chief 15. The basic design was by Louis Mestre, and it incorporated many large press features as he had free use of Webendorfer patents. As it gave large press performance, it was an immediate success with commercial printers (who were disdainful of duplicators), and the Chief line remained the best of the small presses until the introduction of Heidelberg's T-Offset in the late 1980s. A larger Chief 17 was introduced in the 1960s and the 1970s saw "common blanket" two color models of both the 15 and 17. Both Chief models were made and sold in Europe by Gestetner Cyclograph Company, and were also marketed in the United States by the Itek and Ditto corporations.

Though the Chief could produce superlative work, unlike the highly popular A.B. Dick 350, it required a skilled operator. Unfortunately for ATF, the quick printing industry had less use for such quality work and more need of a "fast and dirty" duplicator like the 350 and so its market penetration was limited.

In 1966 White Consolidated Industries acquired the Whitin Machine Works and with it control of ATF.

ATF later purchased the competing Davidson line of duplicators and changed their name to ATF-Davidson. Breaking their pattern of low investment in upgrading technology, ATF actually developed improved models of the Davidson and this line remained competitive right to the end. The Davidson however, was an unusual design (with two, rather than the usual three cylinders) and its popularity remained limited.

== Divestiture of the foundry ==
By the 1980s the foundry in Elizabeth, New Jersey was down to only six employees and duplicator manufacture was the principle business of ATF-Davidson. In 1986 foundry was sold off to Kingsley Machines, a maker of foil-stamping type, and the merged company was renamed Kingsley/ATF. Immediately a bid was made to enter the field of digital typography with a software subsidiary being set up in Tucson. With its enormous library of type, and its patents on the optical scaling of type, a digital library of ATF types seemed to be a good investment. As the original drawings of the faces were mostly lost, these fonts had to be scanned from brass matrices, a daunting prospect. The work was well done, but slow, and only four faces (Wedding Text, Thompson Quill Script, Bernhard Fashion, and T.M. Cleland's border designs) were ever issued before Kingsley/ATF sought bankruptcy protection in 1993. An auction was held on August 23, 1993, and all the assets of the foundry were sold off, most of the priceless matrices going to scrap dealers. ATF designs remain the property of Kingsley Holding Corporation and are now licensed through Adobe and Bitstream. ATF's factory is now an apartment block.

Though ATF is now defunct, some of their original type casting machines and matrix engraving equipment are still in use at The Dale Guild Type Foundry in Howell, New Jersey. This equipment was saved through efforts coordinated by Theo Rehak, the last person trained to run these machines at ATF's Elizabeth, New Jersey facility.

== ATF-Davidson and successor corporations ==
By the early 1980s, the Chief line needed updating and a crash program was undertaken to produce a press that could compete with the A.B.Dick 9800 series. The SuperChief was thus introduced in 1986 with many flaws. Most of these were worked out, and the basic design was re-launched in 1988 as the X-Press line. Unfortunately, this was too late to save the reputation of the Chief line and the company shut down in July 1990. After a period of confusion, Jim Hughes of Printer's Parts Store purchased the assets of the company and operated under the name of ATF-Graphic Products, selling presses that were on hand and supplying spare parts. Wishing to revive the Davidson line of presses. In about 1995 Ron Basick purchased controlling interest from James Hughs. Ron Basick manufactured new Davidsons and parts for Chief line. In 2002 a court ordered auction was held. Mark daggy ATF Davidson Ltd. since 2002 purchased a Davidson line continue to build prices and parts. Jim Wheet ATF Services Inc. since 1992 an independent mechanic purchase parts inventory for the Chief press to supply parts for existing presses under the name ATF Services Inc., While Printer's Parts continues to manufacture new parts for printing equipment

== Typefaces ==
=== Branches after consolidation ===
From the merger in 1892 until 1903, when all typecasting was centralized in Jersey City, these foundries were consolidated into the following branches and codes:

- ATF Foundry A (Code #1) at Boston
  - Dickinson Type Foundry
- ATF Foundry A (Code #2) at Boston
  - Boston Type Foundry
- ATF Foundry B (Code #3) at New York
  - James Conner's Sons
  - Benton, Waldo & Co.
- ATF Foundry C (Code #4) at Philadelphia
  - MacKellar, Smiths, & Jordan Co.'
- ATF Foundry D (Code #11) at Cincinnati
  - Cincinnati Type Foundry
- ATF Foundry E (Code #12) at Chicago
  - Marder, Luse, & Co.
  - Cleveland Type Foundry
- ATF Foundry F (Code #15) at St. Louis
  - Central Type Foundry at St. Louis
- ATF Foundry G (Code #23) at San Francisco
  - Palmer & Rey
- ATF Foundry H (Code #6) at Baltimore
  - The John Ryan Co.

=== Later mergers and acquisitions ===
- Farmer, Little & Co., (1892, New York), (established 1810).
- Central Type Foundry, (1893, St. Louis), (established 1870).
  - Boston Type Foundry, Boston, a subsidiary of Central of Saint Louis, (established 1817).
- Bruce Type Foundry, (1901, New York), (established 1813).
- H. L. Pelouze & Son Type Founders, (1901, Boston)
- Barnhart Brothers & Spindler, (1911, Chicago), operated as an independent entity until 1929.
  - Western Type Foundry (St. Louis), bought by B.B.&S in 1918.
    - Advance Type Foundry (AKA Wiebking, Hardinge & Company), (Chicago), bought out by Western Type Foundry in 1914.
- Inland Type Foundry (1912, St. Louis)
- Golding & Company (1918, Boston), bought by Thomson National Company in 1927
- Keystone Type Foundry (1919, Philadelphia), (established 1883).
- H.C. Hansen Type Foundry (1922, Boston), (established 1872).
- Webendorfer-Wills Company (1938, Mount Vernon, New York), a manufacturer of offset presses and the Little Giant letterpress cylinder press.
- Dystrom Corporation, a furniture manufacturer
- Davidson Corporation, a manufacturer of offset presses
- Lanston Monotype, (1969, Philadelphia, Pennsylvania), assets later sold off to M&H Typefounders.
- Several other firms.

== See also ==
- Pirouette: Turning Points in Design – 2025 exhibition at the Museum of Modern Art
