= Artcraft (typeface) =

- Category: Serif
- Classification: Old Style
- Designer: Robert Wiebking
- Foundry: Advance Type Foundry
- Date released: 1912
- Re-issuing foundries: Western Type Foundry; Barnhart Brothers & Spindler; American Type Founders; Ludlow; Monotype

Artcraft is an Old Style typeface engraved in 1912 by Robert Wiebking for Wiebking, Hardinge & Company which ran the Advance Type Foundry. It was originally called Craftsman, then Art-Craft, before finally becoming Artcraft. After Advance was sold to the Western Type Foundry in 1914, Wiebking added Artcraft Bold and Artcraft Italic. After Western was sold to Barnhart Brothers & Spindler (a subsidiary of American Type Founders) the face was sold by both BB&S and ATF.

Artcraft is typical of the turn-of-the-century's Chicago School of Hand Lettering: a decorative serif design intended for advertisement text more than book body setting. Other types based upon advertising and hand-lettering were developed around the same time, such as Frederic Goudy's Pabst (1902) and Powell (1903), as well as Oz Cooper's Packard (1913). The face retained a wide popularity for more than two decades.

Wiebking, whose reputation was based upon his collaboration as a matrix cutter for other designers, occasionally ventured a design of his own. Though he is usually credited with creating Artcraft, type historian Alexander Lawson believes that the type was probably created by Edmund C. Fischer.

== Other versions ==
Artcraft was copied for machine composition by Monotype and for hand casting by Ludlow. The Ludlow matrices were cut by R. Hunter Middleton. There is also a face known as Art and Craft cast by Stephenson Blake which might be the same thing.

The face was later made available in cold type and digital versions are now offered by the Font Company, URW++, and Ascender Corporation.
