= Robert Wiebking =

German-American typeface designer (1870–1927)

Robert Wiebking (1870–1927) was a German-American engraver typeface designer who was known for cutting type matrices for Frederic Goudy from 1911 to 1926.

== Life and career ==
Robert Wiebking was born in Schwelm, Germany in 1870, he emigrated to Chicago in 1881 where his father worked as an engraver for many companies, including the Marder, Luse, & Co. type foundry. In 1884, Wiebking began working for C. H. Hanson, an engraving company. By 1893 he was in business for himself, cutting type matrices for both the Crescent and Independent Type Foundries. In 1900, with H. H. Hardinge, he formed ‘‘Wiebking, Hardinge & Company’’ which ran the Advance Type Foundry. In 1914 the partnership was dissolved and Advance merged with the Western Type Foundry. After Western Foundry merged into Barnhart Brothers & Spindler, Wiebking began working once again for himself. He then designed type and cut matrices for many foundries and, from 1911 to 1926 (with a few exceptions) he cut all of the matrices for Frederic Goudy's designs were cut by Wiebking. He taught both Goudy and R. Hunter Middleton how to cut matrices.

== Typefaces ==
=== Typefaces designed by Wiebking ===
- World Gothic series, a series in name only, as three only marginally similar faces were brought together under one heading as a marketing ploy to compete with ATF's Globe Gothic.
  - World Gothic (BB&S), originally Wesel.
  - 'World Gothic Condensed (1897 BB&S), originally Tropic [No. 5].
  - World Gothic Italic (1897 BB&S), originally named Dewey [No. 5] in honor of Admiral Dewey.
- Engravers Roman + Bold (1899, BB&S, later ATF.
- Typo Script (1902, ATF), later known as Tiffany Script. Usually credited to Morris Fuller Benton, but attributed to Wiebking by R. Hunter Middleton.
- Steelplate Gothic series a knock-off of Goudy's Copperplate Gothic, they were originally cut for Western Type Foundry under various names, and then renamed when that foundry was bought out by Barnhart Brothers & Spindler. When BB&S was in turn bought out by American Type Founders (owners of the original Copperplate) most of the line was dropped.
  - Farley (1907, Western Type Foundry), later renamed Steelplate Gothic Extra Light Extended by BB&S and later ATF.
  - Perry (Western Type Foundry), later renamed Steelplate Gothic Heavy Extended by BB&S and later ATF.
  - Perry Italic (Western Type Foundry), later renamed Steelplate Gothic Italic by BB&S and later ATF.
  - Steelplate Gothic Extra Light + Steelplate Gothic Light + Steelplate Gothic Light Condensed + Steelplate Gothic Heavy + Steelplate Gothic Heavy Condensed + Steelplate Gothic Bold ( Western Type Foundry, later BB&S, still later ATF)
  - Steelplate Gothic Shaded (1918, BB&S later ATF), known in England as Spartan Outline.
- Artcraft series
  - Craftsman (1912, Advance Type Foundry) When Advance was taken over by Western Type Foundry, the face was renamed Art-Craft. This was shortened to one name, Artcraft, when Western was taken over by Barnhart Brothers & Spindler. The line was retained by American Type Founders when, in turn, it bought out BB&S.
  - Artcraft Italic (1912, Western Type Foundry), later BB&S still later ATF)
  - Artcraft Bold (1913, Western Type Foundry), later BB&S still later ATF)
- Modern Text (1913, Advance Type Foundry, later Western Type Foundry and BB&S).
- Caslon series
  - Caslon Catalog (1913, Advance Type Foundry, later BB&S, still later ATF)
  - Caslon Clearface + Italic (1913, Western Type Foundry, later BB&S, still later ATF)
  - Caslon Light Italic (1922, BB&S)
- Invitation Text (1914, BB&S, later ATF).
- Rogers Roman (1915, Western Type Foundry), later renamed Engravers Litho Bold by BB&S who then added a Bold Condensed and a Bold Condensed Title. The line was retained by ATF after the merger.
- Advertisers Gothic series (1917, Western Type Foundry, later BB&S, still later ATF). The outline faces are cut to register with the solid type for two-color work.
  - Advertisers Gothic
  - Advertisers Gothic Condensed
  - Advertisers Gothic Outline
  - Advertisers Gothic Condensed Outline
- Square Gothic (1920, Laclede Type Foundry, later Ludlow), a knock-off of Benton's Franklin Gothic.
- Munder series
  - Laclede Oldstyle (1922, Laclede Type Foundry), when Laclede was bought out by BB&S this face was re-cut as Munder Venetian and named in honor of Norman T. A. Munder dean of American printers.
  - Munder Venetian (1924, BB&S, later ATF). Copied by Stephenson Blake as ‘‘Verona’’.
  - Munder Bold (1925, BB&S, later ATF)
  - Munder Italic (1926, BB&S, later ATF)
  - Munder Bold Italic (1927, BB&S, later ATF)
- Bodoni Series
  - Bodoni Light + Light Italic (1923, Ludlow)
  - True-Cut Bodoni + Light Italic (1928, Ludlow), modeled on original samples of Bodoni's work at the Newberry Library.

=== Type Matrices cut by Wiebking ===
- Pabst Old Style or Pabst Roman (1902, ATF), based on hand lettering done by Frederic Goudy for advertisements for the Pabst Brewing Company, though commissioned by a Chicago department store. Cast by ATF with the proviso that the department store would have the exclusive use of the font for a time before it would be offered to the public. This was the first of many collaborations by Goudy and Wiebking.
  - Pabst Roman Italic (1903, ATF)
- Village (1903, Wiebking, Harding & Co.), design by Goudy. Originally designed for Kuppenheimer & Company, who later decided it would be too expensive to cast, it was later bought by Frederick Sherman. The mats are still extant and cast by Dale Guild Foundry.
- Baron's Boston News Letter (1904, ATF), a private face designed by Frederic Goudy for Joseph Baron's financial newsletter.
- Norman Capitals (1910, ATF), designed by Frederic Goudy for Munder-Thompson Company, a Baltimore printing firm, and named for Norman Munder.
- Klaxon (1914, cut for Klaxon Auto Warning Signal Company), designed by Frederic Goudy
- Centaur (1914, ATF), a private type for the Museum Press of the Metropolitan Museum of Art designed by Bruce Rogers.
- Hadriano Title (1918, Lanston Monotype), designed by Frederic Goudy
- Goudy Open (1918, Village Letter Foundry + 1924, Monotype Ltd.), designed by Frederic Goudy
  - Goudy Modern (1918, Village Letter Foundry + 1924, Monotype Ltd.), basically just a “filled in” version of Goudy Open, designed by Frederic Goudy.
  - Goudy Open Italic + Modern Italic (1919, Village Letter Foundry + 1924, Monotype Ltd.), designed by Frederic Goudy
- Collier Old Style (1919, ATF), designed by Frederic Goudy for Proctor & Collier, a Cincinnati advertising agency.
- Lining Gothic (1921, nc), drawings by Frederic Goudy for this face were complete, but when Wiebking was late in cutting the matrices, the order was canceled.
- Nabisco (1921, privately cast), cut by Frederic Goudy for the National Biscuit Company based on the hand-lettered logotype he had done for them twenty years before.
- Marlborough (1925), a private face designed by Frederic Goudy for a printer who lost interest in the project before completion. The design was sold to Lanston Monotype who, evidently, did nothing with it.
- Newberry Binding Type (1935, ATF) Drawings by Ernst F. Detterer, metal patterns by R. Hunter Middleton, matrices cut by Wiebking, cast in brass by American Type Founders for the Newberry Library.
