= Western Type Foundry =

- Type: Defunct
- Industry: Type foundry
- Founded: Saint Louis, Missouri, United States, 1901
- Defunct: 1919
- Headquarters: Saint Louis, Missouri, United States
- Key people: Robert Wiebking

Western Type Foundry was founded in 1901 to compete with the conglomerate and near-monopoly, American Type Founders. In 1914 Western purchased the Advance Type Foundry in Chicago from Wiebking, Hardinge & Company, though even before this Robert Wiebking did most of the punch-cutting and matrix making for Western. Among the matrices that Wiebking for the foundry were his own designs for Farley, Perry, Artcraft, and Advertisers Gothic, a re-cutting of Caslon, and the original matrices for Bruce Rogers's deservedly famous Centaur typeface. The foundry was closed in 1919, transferring all of its equipment and holdings to Barnhart Brothers & Spindler in 1919.

Over its lifetime, the foundry issued four specimen books, in 1906, 1909, 1912 and 1917.

The Western Type Foundry is not to be confused with the Great Western Type Foundry which later became Barnhart Brothers & Spindler.
