= Theo Rehak =

Theo Rehak (1947 – January 11, 2024) was a typefounder and the author of Practical Typecasting (ISBN 0-938768-33-6), The Fall of ATF; a Serio-Comedic Tragedy and co-author of The Music and Life of Theodore "Fats" Navarro" (ISBN 0-8108-6721-4). He was one of the few remaining craftsmen in the field of metal typefounding. Rehak was the last person trained at American Type Founders before their 1993 bankruptcy. He formed The Dale Guild Type Foundry in 1994, purchasing a significant portion of ATF equipment at the firm's liquidation auction. He was also a historian and has assisted museums, including The Smithsonian, around the world in creating exhibits and demonstrating printing technologies.

The Dale Guild Type Foundry, located in Howell, New Jersey, is one of the last type foundries in the United States to cast hard foundry type. Rehak had several Barth casters, a Benton engraving machine, and a collection of original type matrices. This equipment had enabled Rehak to continue casting functional type of historical importance.

In 1999, The Dale Guild were asked to produce a new, facsimile cutting of Johannes Gutenberg's Biblia Latina types. Rehak, and Alan Waring, the Dale Guild's "Art Department" spent 5 months making drawings, cutting matrices and casting type. This became known as Dale Guild B-42. Because of its numerous alternate characters and ligatures this typeface has about 240 distinct characters.

He also served as President of The Typophiles from 1995 to 2005.
