= Will Ransom =

American graphic designer, letter, typeface designer, bibliographer (1878–1955)

- Born: 1878; St. Louis, Michigan, U.S.
- Died: May 24, 1955 (aged 76–77)
- Occupations: Bookkeeper, graphic designer, art editor, typeface designer
- Spouse: Helen Ruhman
- Children: 1

Will Ransom (1878 – May 24, 1955) was an American graphic designer, letterer, typeface designer, and the foremost bibliographer of private presses.

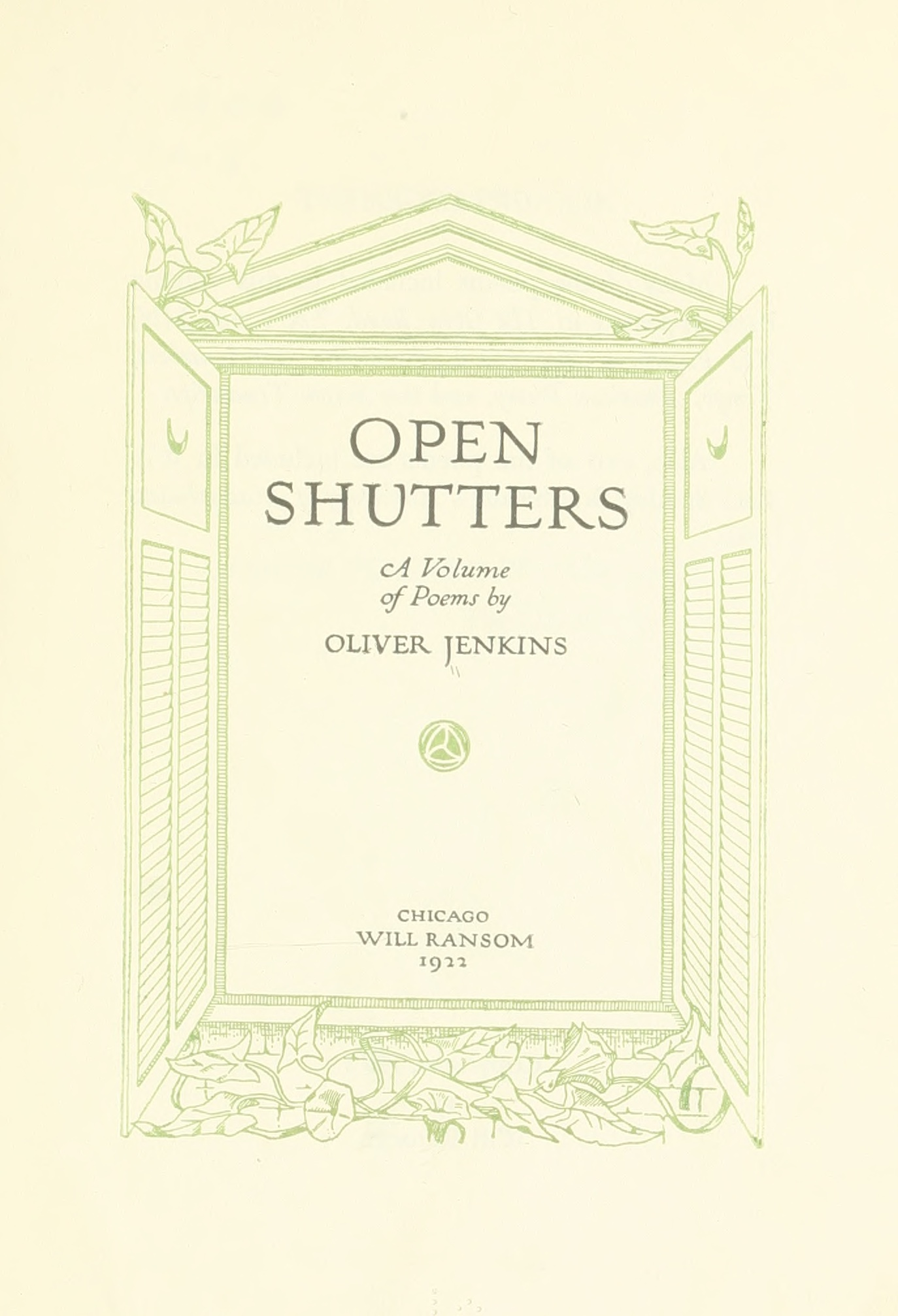
Open Shutters, a poetry collection by Oliver Jenkins, published by Will Ransom in 1922

== Youth and early career ==
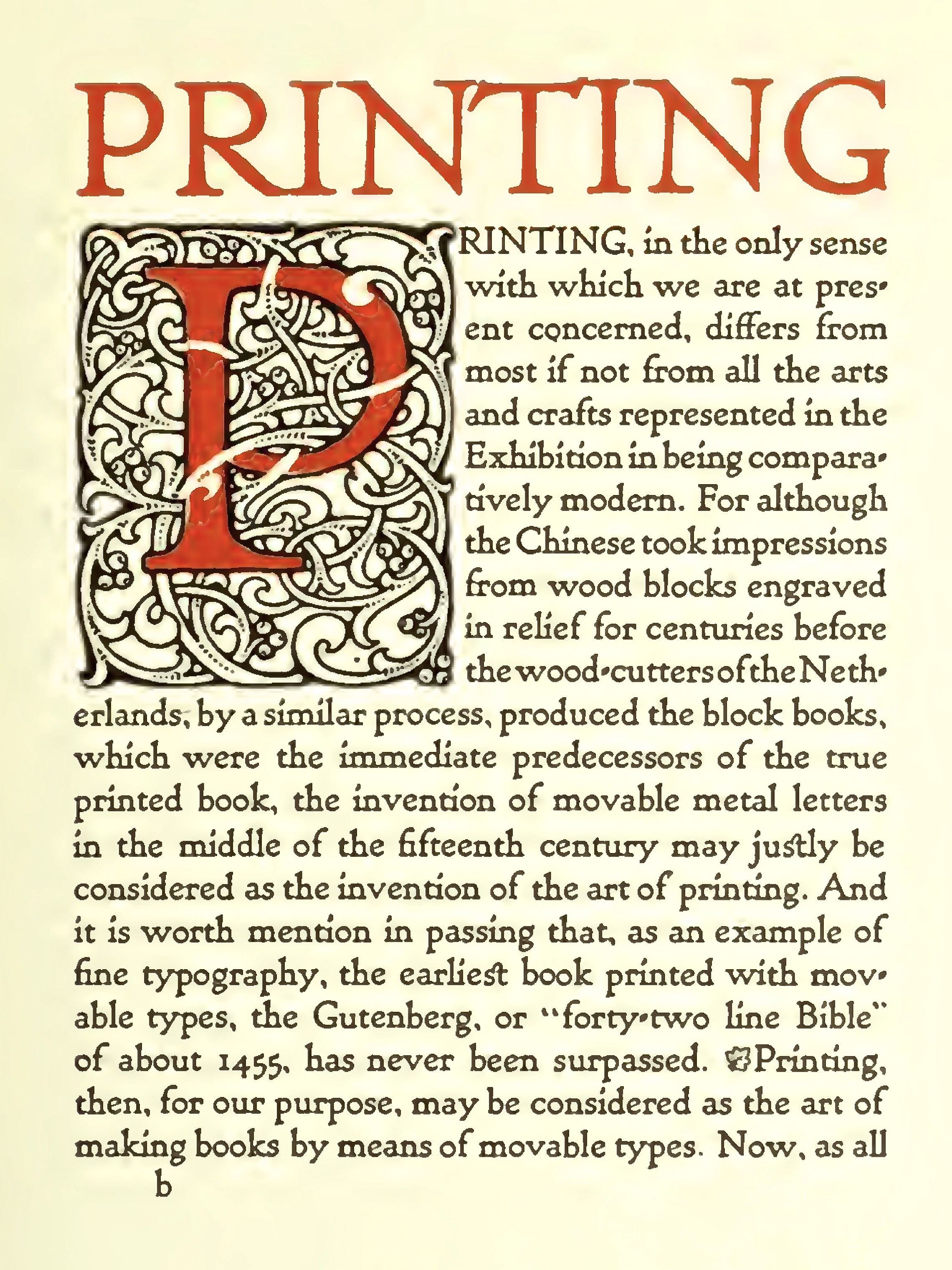
"Printing" by William Morris, as reprinted by the Village Press, run by Will Ransom and Frederic Goudy, c. 1903

Born in St. Louis, Michigan, Ransom grew up in Snohomish, Washington, and began his career as a reporter, bookkeeper, and printer's devil for several papers in the Northwest.

Long interested in design, and having printed several art books on his own, Ransom was persuaded in 1903 to study at Frank Holmes’ School of Illustration. There, he joined a group of young designers including Oswald Cooper, W.A. Dwiggins, and Frederic Goudy.

Later that year, Ransom and Goudy founded the Village Press in Park Ridge, Illinois. After an unprofitable year of operation, Ransom ceded sole proprietorship to Goudy, and for the next nine years, took work as a bookkeeper.

In 1911, he married Helen Ruhman, a piano teacher. They had one child, a daughter, Frances Rose.

== Design career ==
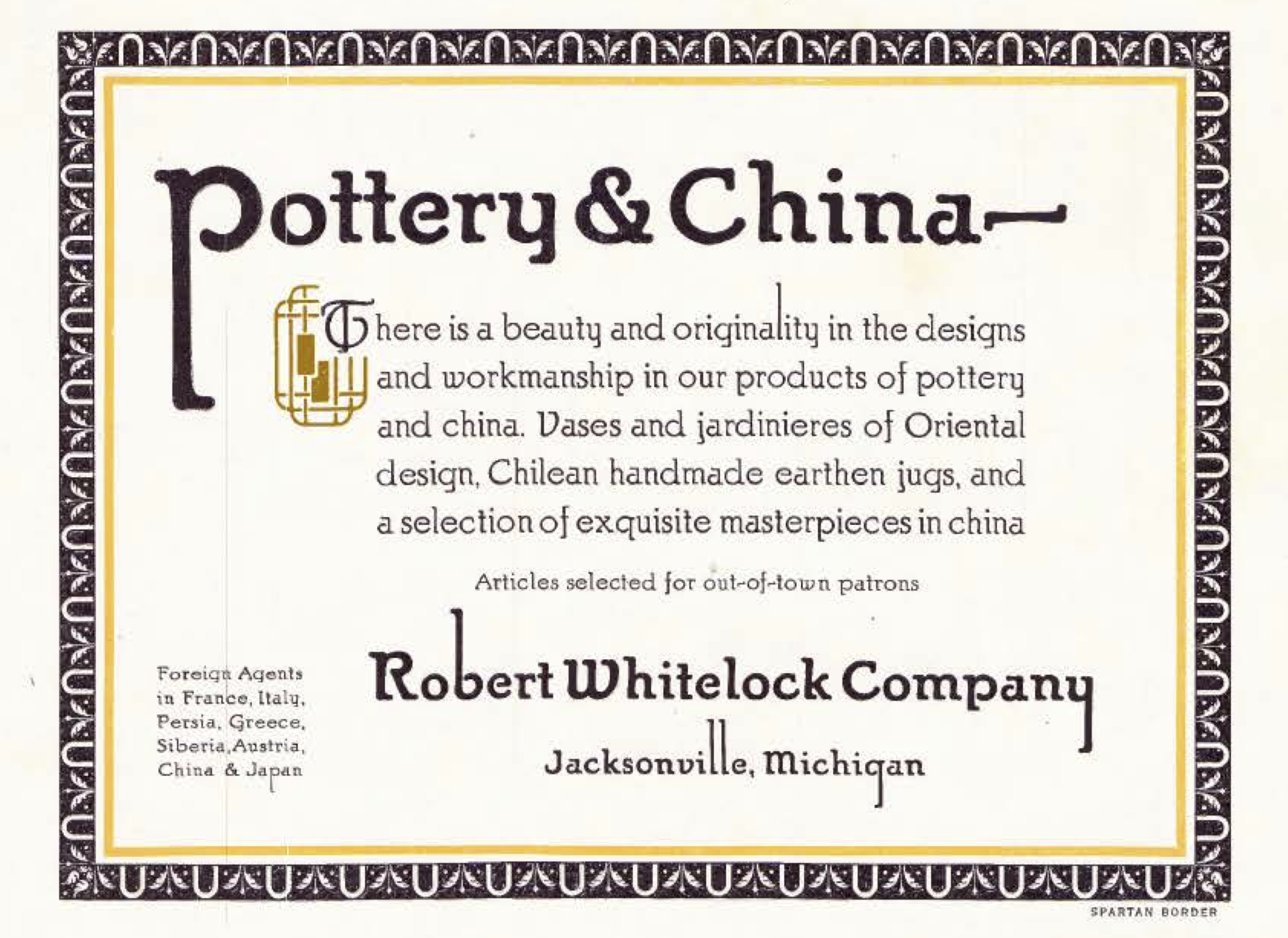
A sample advertisement made in the typeface Parsons from an ATF specimen book

Encouraged by his wife, Ransom again tried his hand at design, setting up shop as a freelance artist, designing advertisements for both Carson Pirie Scott and Marshall Field's department stores and the Rock Island Rail Road, as well as books for several publishers.

At this point, he designed his typeface, Parsons, which he named for I.R. Parsons, an advertising manager for Carson's department store. The face was an immediate success, not only popular with printers, and used in all of Carson's advertisements for many years, but was among the most frequently used faces in motion picture titles and captions.

He was credited by C. J. Bulliet, editor of the art magazine for the Chicago Evening Post and later art critic of the Chicago Daily News, of having introduced (in 1923) Helen West Heller to woodcutting, after which she went on to become one of the world's foremost practitioners of that field.

== Maker of books ==
In 1921, Ransom began publishing under the imprint of Will Ransom, Maker of Books. These volumes of fine printing were designed and decorated by Ransom, printed on paper made by Dard Hunter, and generally well regarded. The publishing venture proved unprofitable, however, and was abandoned in 1925.

== Later career ==
After again freelancing for a period, Ransom became director of typography at the Faithorn Company.

In 1927, Ransom began writing a series on private presses for Publishers Weekly, a task for which he was well suited, and which led to publication of his book Private Presses and Their Books (R.R. Bowker, N.Y.C., 1929).

In 1930, he left Chicago for Rochester, New York, where he was employed by the Printing House of Leo Hart as a book designer for five years. In 1935, he moved to Buffalo, New York, where again he worked freelance.

By this time, Ransom had an impressive reputation as a printing historian, so in 1939, Melbert Cary gave him a job in New York City with the American Institute of Graphic Arts supervising the celebration of the 500th anniversary of printing. After this job terminated, he took work designing books for the Limited Editions Club and for Little and Ives.

In 1941, Ransom became art editor for the University of Oklahoma Press. This last was his most satisfying position, as it allowed him to design books, and to continue his work on bibliography.

== Books ==
- Private Presses and Their Books, R.R. Bowker, N.Y.C., 1929
- The First Days of the Village Press: Extracts from the Diary of Will Ransom, Press of the Woolly Whale, N.Y.C., 1937

== Typefaces ==
- Parsons series This font featured unique alternate characters that Ransom wished designers to use sparingly. However, as the font proved hugely popular, these letters were used indiscriminately and with bad taste. Ransom was so disgusted with this misuse of his font that he all but refused to design any more faces.
  - Parsons (1917, Barnhart Brothers & Spindler (BB&S), later American Type Founders (ATF))
  - Parsons Bold (1918, BB&S, later ATF)
  - Parsons Italic (1918, BB&S, later ATF)
  - Parsons Swash Initials were designed for BB&S by Sidney Gaunt, not Ransom
- Several series of Border Units (1920 - 1922, BB&S)
- Clearcut Shaded Capitals, sometimes called Ransom Shaded Initials (1924, BB&S, later ATF), capitals only, font does not include an X or Z.
