= Sidney Gaunt =

Sidney Clyde Gaunt (c. 1874 - 1932) was an American type designer and artist.

He was a prolific producer of type designs while "shop artist" for Barnhart Brothers & Spindler Type Foundry. He had his own studio in New York City in the early 1920s.

== Typefaces ==
- Authors Roman series (BB&S later ATF)
  - Authors Roman + Wide + Italic (1902)
  - Authors Roman Bold (1909)
  - Authors Oldstyle + Italic + Bold (1912)
  - Authors Roman Condensed (1915)
  - Authors Roman Bold Condensed (1916)
- Talisman (1903, BB&S), later reissued as Rugged Bold.
  - Talisman Italic (1904, BB&S), later reissued as Rugged Bold Italic.
- Wedding Plate-Script (1904, BB&S later ATF)
- Stationers Semi-Script (1904, BB&S later ATF), a redesign of Inland Type Foundry's Palmer Series of 1899.
- French Plate Script (1904, BB&S later ATF), based on types cut by Fonderie Gustave Mayeur of Paris
- Mission (1904, BB&S later ATF), designed by Gaunt but patented by George Oswald Ottley.
- Barnhart Oldstyle series
  - Barnhart Oldstyle (1906, BB&S later ATF)
  - Barnhart Oldstyle Italic + Oldstyle No. 2 (1907, BB&S later ATF)
  - Barnhart Lightface (1914, BB&S)
- Adstyle series (BB&S later ATF)
  - Adstyle (1906)
  - Adstyle Black (1907–11)
  - Adstyle Condensed (1907–11)
  - Adstyle Extra Condensed (1907–11)
  - Adstyle Headletter (1907–11)
  - Adstyle Italic (1907–11)
  - Adstyle Wide (1907–11)
  - Adstyle Black Outline (1910)
  - Adstyle Lightface (1911)
  - Adstyle Shaded (1914)
- Old Roman series (BB&S later ATF), adapted from T.W. Smith's original design for H.W. Caslon & Company in England.
  - Old Roman Condensed (1907)
  - Old Roman Bold + Bold Condensed + Semitone (1908)
- Engravers Old Black (1910, BB&S) a knock-off of ATF's Engravers Old English.
- Cardstyle (1914, BB&S later ATF) Capitals and small caps only.
- Engravers Roman Shaded (1914, BB&S later ATF)
- Chester Text (1914, BB&S later ATF) Capitals and small caps only.
- Pencraft Oldstyle series (BB&S later ATF)
  - Pencraft Oldstyle + Italic (1914)
  - Pencraft Bold (1915)
  - Pencraft Shaded (1916)
- Publicity Gothic (1916, BB&S later ATF), later digitized by Fonts.Com and MyFonts.
- Pencraft Text (1916, BB&S later ATF)
- Parsons Swash Initials (BB&S), alternate characters for Will Ransom's Parsons series cut without Ransom's approval.
