= Antique No. 1 =

Antique No. 1 may refer to:

- Antique No. 1 (1904 typeface), a typeface produced by Stephenson Blake
- Antique No. 1 (1906 typeface), a typeface produced by Inland Type Foundry
