= Forelle =

Forelle (German for trout) may refer to:

- "Die Forelle" (D. 550), a song by Franz Schubert (1797–1828)
- A foundry type; see Rheingold at Trennert Type Foundry#Typefaces
- A cultivar of pear

== See also ==
- Forellenquintett (Trout Quintet), a piano quintet (D 667) by Franz Schubert
