= Genzsch & Heyse =

Genzsch & Heyse Schriftgießerei A.G.
- Company type: Aktiengesellschaft
- Industry: Type foundry
- Founded: 1833
- Founder: Johann August Genzsch
- Defunct: 1963
- Headquarters: Hamburg, Germany
- Parent: Bauersche Gießerei; Berthold Type Foundry; Stempel Type Foundry

Genzsch & Heyse was a German type foundry established in Hamburg. In the 1920s and 1930s, G+H types were sold in the United States by Continental Type Founders Association.

== Typefaces ==
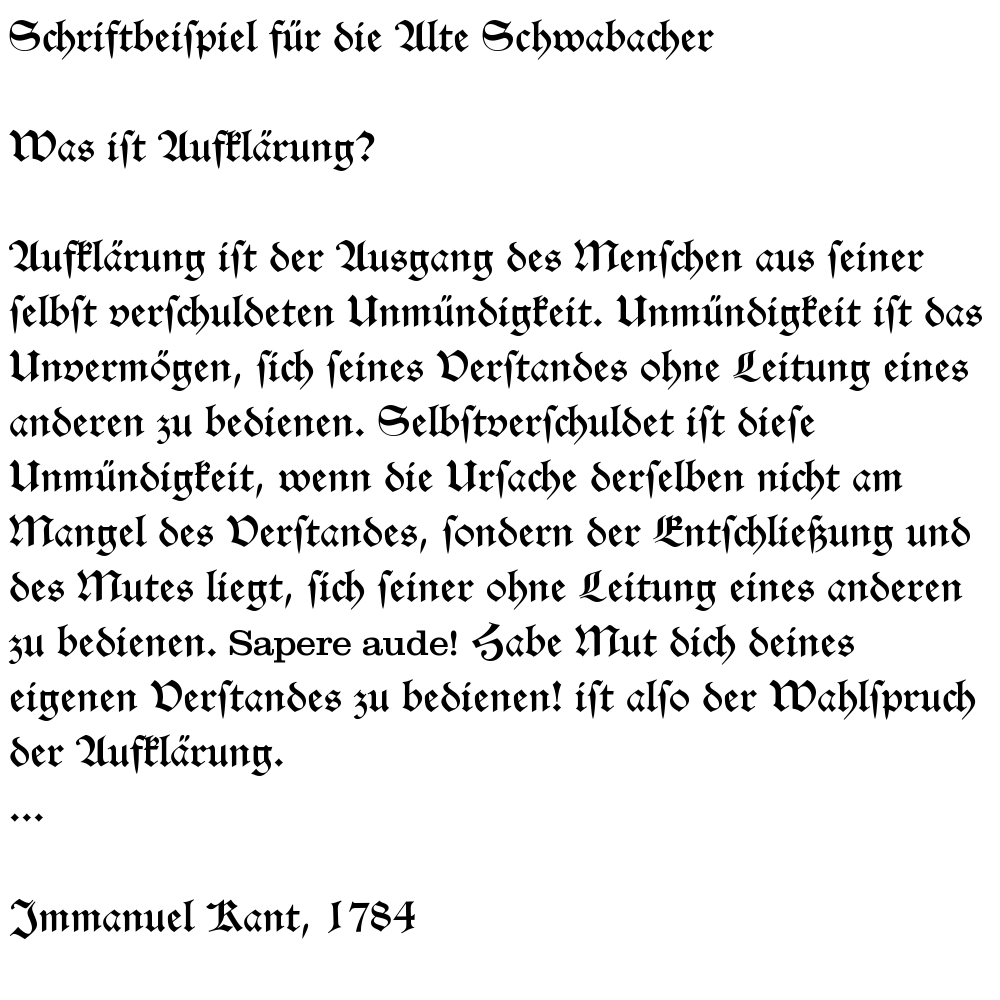
Example in typeface Alte-Schwabacher

The following foundry types were issued by the Trennert Type Foundry:

- Alte Schwabacher (before 1936)
- Arkona + Fett (before 1936)
- Bodoni + Halbfette + Kursiv (before 1936)
- Brahms Gotisch (before 1936)
- Fette Antiqua (before 1936)
- Friedrich Bauer Grotesk (before 1936, Friedrich Bauer), in addition to a basic face, there were three other versions, Magere, Kräftige, Halbfette, Fette, and Schmale Halbfette. Also cast by the Trennert Type Foundry.
- Fridericus Antiqua + Halbfette + Fette (before 1936)
- Genzsch Antiqua (before 1936), in addition to a basic face, there were several other versions, Halbfette, Fette, Kursiv, Halbfette Kursiv, and Fette Zeitungskursiv.
- Halbfette Antiqua (before 1936)
- Heyse + Semi-Bold (1924, Friedrich Bauer)
- Leibniz Fraktur + Grobe (before 1936)
- Nofretete + Halbfette (before 1936)
- Olympia 1 + 2 (before 1936)
- Phalanx + Halbfette (before 1936)
- Richard Wagner Fraktur + Halbfette (before 1936)
- Römische Antiqua (before 1897) later sold by Inland Type Foundry as MacFarland and by A.D. Farmer & Son as Bradford, matrices for machine composition later offered by Lanston Monotype, also as MacFarland.
- Semper Antiqua + Halbfette + Kursiv (1941–1951)
- Senats Fraktur + Halbfette (before 1936)
- Sparta (before 1936)
