= Barnhart Brothers & Spindler =

American type foundry

Barnhart Brothers & Spindler Type Foundry
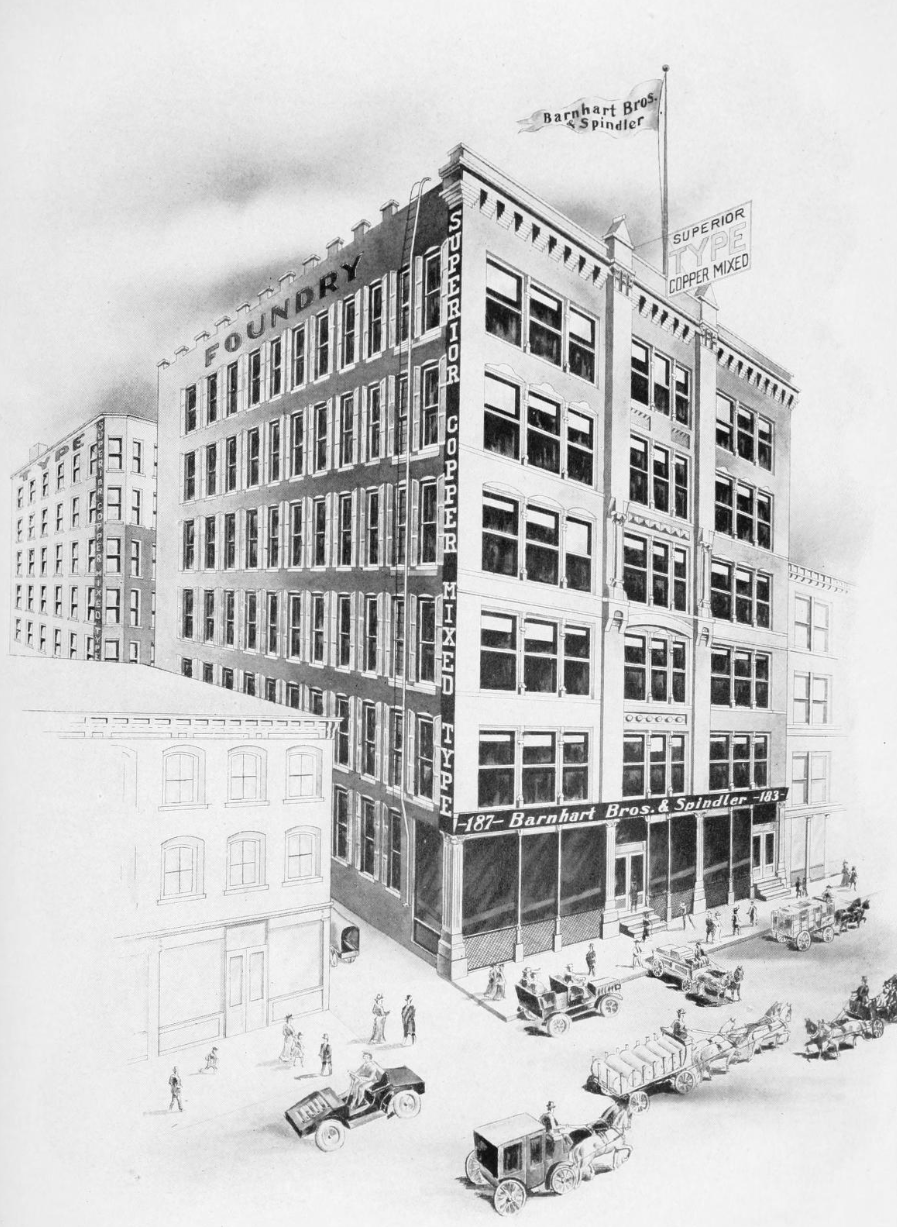
- c. 1908
- Type: Defunct
- Industry: Type foundry
- Founded: 1873; 153 years ago in Chicago, Illinois, United States
- Defunct: 1933
- Headquarters: Chicago, Illinois, United States
- Key people: Oswald Cooper, Will Ransom, Robert Wiebking, Sidney Gaunt

Barnhart Brothers & Spindler Type Foundry was an American type foundry based in Chicago.

== History ==
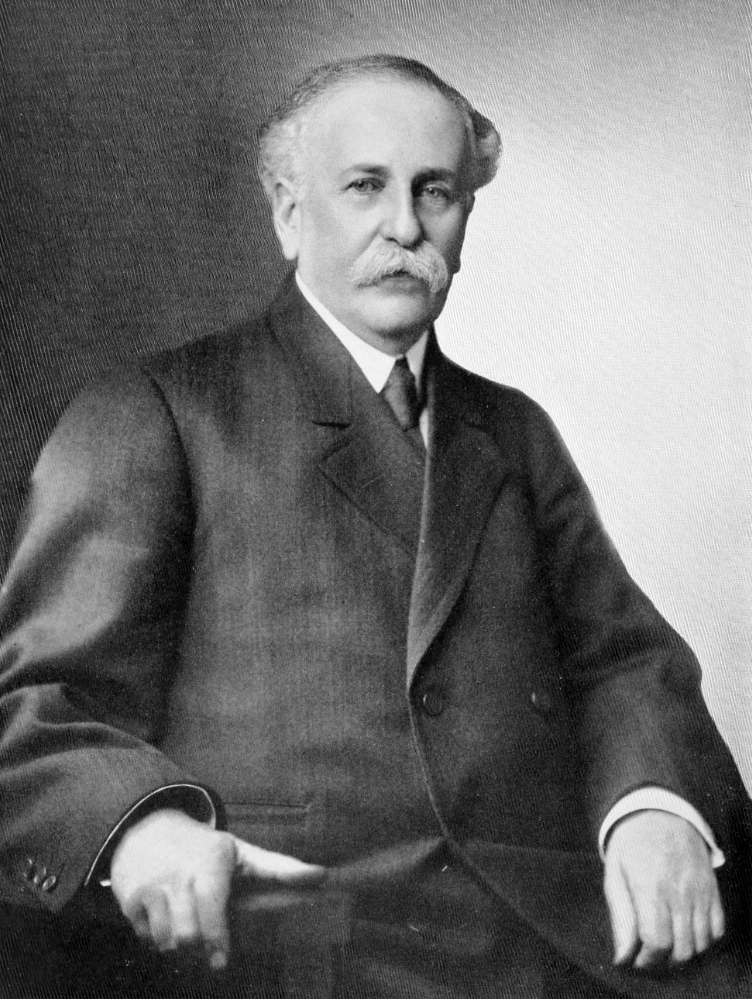
Arthur Middleton Barnhart

In 1869, the brothers Alson E., Arthur Middleton, George W., and Warren Barnhart purchased the Great Western Type Foundry. They subsequently incorporated as Barnhart Brothers & Spindler. It was a successful foundry known for innovative type design and well designed type catalogs. Oz Cooper, Will Ransom, Robert Wiebking, and Sidney Gaunt all designed for BB&S. It was bought out by American Type Founders in 1911 with the proviso that the merger would not take effect for twenty years, so that the employees would have a chance to find new work or retire over time. The foundry was finally closed in 1933.

== Mergers and acquisitions ==
- Advance Type Foundry (AKA Wiebking, Hardinge & Company), Chicago, bought out by Western Type Foundry in 1914.
- Western Type Foundry, Saint Louis, Missouri, bought by B.B.&S in 1918.

== Typefaces ==
These foundry types were originally cast by Barnhart Brothers & Spindler:

=== A ===
- Adcraft
  - Adcraft lightface, 8-48pt, or Puritan, Hansen (8-48pt) ATF 1501
  - Adcraft Medium, 6-72pt, ATF 1502
  - Adcraft Bold or Plymouth, 6-120pt
  - Adcraft Black or Plymouth Bold, 6-72pt, ATF 1500
- Adstyle design: Sidney C. Gaunt, 1906, 6-120pt, ATF 1503
  - Adstyle Italic 6-72pt, ATF 1509
  - Adstyle Condensed 10-120pt, ATF 1506
  - Adstyle Extra Condensed 10-108pt ATF 1507
  - Adstyle Wide 6-60pt, ATF 1511
  - Ádstyle lightface
  - Adstyle Black 6-96pt, ATF 1504
  - Adstyle Outline 12-96pt, ATF 1505
  - Adstyle Shaded10-72pt, ATF 1510, Gaunt: 1914
  - Adstyle Borders, design: T. C. Robinson 1908, 7 series, 12-24pt,
    - Special Reversed Figures: Mono 132S (12-18pt)
- Advertisers Gothic, 6-72pt, Design: Robert Wiebking 1917, for Western Type Foundry take over by BB&S in 1919, ATF 1512
  - Advertisers Gothic Condensed 6-72pt, ATF 1513
  - Advertisers Gothic Outline 6-72pt, ATF 1515
  - Advertisers Gothic Condensed Outline 6-72pt, ATF 1514
- Advertisers Upright Script 14-72pt, original name: Oliphant (1895) renamed in 1925, ATF 1516
- Artcraft, design: Robert Wiebking 1912, 6-72pt
  - Artcraft italic, 6-48pt, ATF 1529, Ludlow 10LI
  - Artcraft Bold, 6-72pt, ATF 1528, Ludlow 10-B
- Authors Roman, design: Sidney Gaunt for BB&S in 1902, other versions were added between 1908 and 1915: 5-72pt, ATF 1531
  - Authors Oldstyle Italic, (5-72pt) ATF 1533
  - Authors Oldstyle Bold 5-72pt, ATF 1532
  - Authors Roman, 5-72pt, ATF 1534
  - Authors Roman Italic, 5-72pt, ATF 1530
  - Authors Roman Condensed, 6-72pt, ATF 1537
  - Authors Roman Wide, 5-48pt, ATF 1538
  - Authors Roman Bold, 5-72pt, ATF 1535
  - Authors Roman Bold Condensed, 6-72pt, ATF 1536,

=== B ===
- Bamboo, original named: Freak, 10-30pt, patented in 1889 by Great Western Type Foundry. in 1925 at BB&S, later copied by Typefounders of Phoenix 18pt
  - Bank Script, Spencerian script, design: James West in 1895 for BB&S, 14-48pt, ATF 1540, the next lower case scripts can be used with the capitals of no.1:
  - Bank Script no.2, lower case alphabet with a larger x-height, 14-38pt, ATF 1712
  - Bank Script no.3, lower case alphabet wider and with a larger x-height, 14-48pt, ATF 1713
- Barnhart Oldstype, design: Sidney Gaunt (1906) (6-72pt), ATF 1544
  - Barnhart Oldstype No.2, (1907) same capitals, larger lower case and shorter descenders, (6-72pt), ATF 1545
  - Barnhart Oldstype Italic, (6-72pt) ATF 1546
  - Barnhart Lightface, (~1914) BB&S
- Bizarre Bold, designed as Edwards in 1895 by Nicolas J. Werner for Inland Type Foundry, in 1925 renamed by BB&S when the Inland-foundry was taken over, 6-60pt, ATF 1548, Inland, Iland (8-60pt)
- Booknam Light Face, (6-25pt) ATF 1551
  - Bookman Bold, (6-72pt) ATF 1549
  - Bookman Bold Condensed, (6-72pt) ATF 1550

=== C ===
- Cardstyle, design: Sidney Gaunt (1914), no lowercase, intended for use in announcements, capitals are cast in several sizes on all of the three bodies. (6s-15L), ATF 1558
- Caslon Oldstyle, 6-72pt, ATF 1569
  - Caslon Oldstyle Italic, (6-72pt), ATF 1570
  - Caslon Italic Specials, (12-72pt), design: Carl S. Junge, 1924
  - Caslon Clearface, (6-72pt), ATF 1565
  - Caslon Clearface Italic, (6-48pt), ATF 1566
  - Caslon Catalog, (6-72pt), ATF 1564
  - Caslon Medium, (6-72pt), ATF 1567
  - Caslon Medium Italic, (6-72pt), ATF 1568
  - Caslon Black, (6-72pt), ATF 1561
  - Caslon Black Italic, (6-72pt), ATF 1563
  - Caslon Black Condensed, (6-72pt), ATF 1562
  - Caslon Openface, (6-72pt), ATF 1571
  - Caslon Open Title, (6-72pt), ATF 1572
  - Caslon Antique, (8-48pt), ATF 1559
  - Caslon Antique Italic, (8-48pt), ATF 1560
  - (Caslon) Old Roman, (6-48pt), ATF 1804
  - (Caslon) Old Roman Italic, (6-48pt),
- Century Roman, (6-24pt), design: Linn Boyd Benton, 1894 for Century Magazine. ATF 1576
  - Century Italic, (6-24pt), ATF 1575ATF 1810
- Gothic Chamfer, (12-54pt) ATF 1643
- Cheltenham Oldstyle, (6-72pt), ATF 87
  - Cheltenham Italic, (6-72pt), ATF 82
  - Cheltenham wide, (6-72pt), ATF 89
  - Cheltenham Medium, (6-72pt), ATF 83
  - Cheltenham Bold, (6-72), ATF 73
  - Cheltenham Bold Italic, (6-72pt), ATF 73
  - Cheltenham Bold Condensed, (6-72pt), ATF 68
  - Cheltenham Bold Condensed Italic, (6-72pt), ATF 69
  - Cheltenham Bold Extra Condensed, (6-120pt), ATF 70
  - Cheltenham Bold Extended, (6-72pt), ATF 72
- Chester Text, 8-14pt, design: Sidney Gaunt 1914, capitals and small capitals, but hard to read, can only be used for names and a few words, ATF 1577
- Clarendon No.5, (5-24pt), ATF 1578
  - Clarendon Extra Condensed No.5, (6-36pt), ATF 1580
  - Clarendon Medium, (Caledonian No.5) (5-36pt), ATF 1581
  - Clarendo Bold, (Lining Doric) (6-48pt), ATF 1579
- Clearcut Oldstyle, (5-72pt), ATF 1582
  - Clearcut Oldstyle Italic, (5-72pt), ATF 1584
  - Clearcut Oldstyle Condensed, (10-72pt), ATF 1583
- Clearcut Shaded Caps, design: Will Ransom, 1924 (12-48pt), ATF 1585
- Cooper, (6-72pt), ATF 1589, Mono 482 (8-36pt)
  - Cooper Italic, (6-72pt) ATF 1595, Mono 4821 (8-36pt)
  - Cooper Black, 6-120pt (1922, design: Oswald Bruce Cooper), ATF 1590
  - Cooper Black Italic, (6-120 pt) ATF 1592
  - Cooper Black Condensed, (6-120pt), ATF 1591
  - Cooper Hilite, (18-120pt), ATF 1594
  - Cooper Fullface, (6-72pt), ATF 1593
  - Cooper Modern, (6-72pt), ATF 1942
  - Cooper Tooled, (18-72pt), Mono 582
  - Cooper Tooled Italic, (10-72pt),
- Copperplate Gothic, design: Frederic W. Goudy, 1903
  - Stealplate Gothic Light, (6s-24L) ATF 1867
  - Stealplate Gothic Light Extended, (6s-24L) ATF 1865
  - Stealplate Gothic Light Condensed, (6s-24L) ATF 1869
  - Stealplate Gothic Light Heavy, (6s-24L) ATF 1868
  - Stealplate Gothic Italic, (6s-24L) ATF 1871
  - Stealplate Gothic Condensed, (6s-24L) ATF 1870
  - Stealplate Gothic Heavy Extended, (6s-24L) ATF 1866ATF 1596
- Cubist Bold, design: John W. Zimmerman (~1929), has no lowercase (10-36pt), ATF 1599
- Custer later: Bookman Lightface (6-24pt)
  - Custer Bold later: Bookman Bold, (6-72pt)

=== D ===
- Demeter (Typeface), (14-48pt), 1925, design: Peter A. Demeter, in cooperation with Schriftguss A.G. in Dresden Germany.
- Dennison Script, (14-48pt), ATF 1602
- De Vinne, 6-72pt, ATF 1602
  - De Vinne Compressed, (6-72pt), ATF 1606
  - De Vinne Extra Compressed, (10-72pt), ATF 1607
  - De Vinne Bold, (6-60pt), ATF 1605 <-!119->
  - De Vinne Recut, (6-60pt) revival of Woodward, design: William A. Schraubstädter 1894 for Inland Type Foundry, ATF 1608
  - De Vinne Recut Outline, (12-60pt) revival of Woodward Outline, ATF 1609
  - Dresden, (12-30pt), design: Peter A. Demeter, ATF 1611

=== E ===
- Engravers English, (6-72pt) ATF 1621
  - Engravers Old Black, (6-96pt) Design: Sidney Gaunt 1910
- Engravers Roman, (6s-24pt), design: Robert Wiebking 1899, ATF 1627
  - Engravers Roman Condensed, (6s-24pt) ATF 1628
  - Engravers Bold (6s-36pt), design: Morris Fuller Benton, ATF 1619
  - Engravers Title (6s-24pt), ATF 1630
  - Engravers Litho Bold, (6-48pt), ATF 1623
  - Engravers Litho Bold Condensed, (5-48pt), ATF 1624
  - Engravers Bold Condensed (title), (6s-48pt), ATF 1620
  - Engravers Roman Shaded, (6s-36pt), ATF 1629
  - Engravers Upright Script, (8-30pt), ATF 1631, original: Pen Text No.5 (~1879) of the Cincinnati Type Foundry, renamed by BB&S, while dropping the fancy capitals
- Engravers Gothic, (6s-30pt), ATF 1622, earlier name: Olympia from Inland Type Foundry At ATF classified as a "Typo-face"

=== F ===
- Faust Text, (8-36pt), based on uncial lettering, in 1925 renamed: Missal Text
- French Clarendon was a nineteenth-century BB&S face that was re-released in 1938 by ATF as P. T. Barnum.
- French Oldstyle no.3, (6-18pt) ATF 1639
- French Oldstyle No.56 (title) (6-48pt) ATF 1640
- French Elsevir Italic No.5, (6-12pt) ATF 1637
- French Plate Script, (14-36pt) ATF 1641

=== G ===
- Gothic No.1, (4-72pt), copy of Franklin Gothic of Morris Fuller Benton ATF 1674
  - Gothic No.1 Condensed, (6-72pt) ATF 1675
  - Gothic No.3, (6-72pt) ATF 1667
  - Gothic Extra Condensed No.6, (6-72pt) ATF 1654
  - Gothic Extra Condensed Title No.6, (8-60pt) ATF 1655
  - Gothic No.47, (6-72pt)
  - Gothic Condensed Title No.117, (5-120pt) ATF 1651
  - Gothic Italic or Degree Gothic No.1, (6-24PT) ATF 1600 or 1658
  - Gothic Italic Light or Degree Gothic No.2, (5-12pt) ATF 1659
  - Gothic Inclined, (6-24pt) ATF 1656
  - Gothic Inclined Light, (6-24pt) ATF 1657
  - Gothic Novelty, (8-14pt) ATF 1671
  - Gothic Novelty Title, (6-24pt) ATF 1673
  - Gothic Novelty Condensed, (12-60pt) ATF 1672
  - Gothic Outline Title, (12-72pt) ATF 1676
  - Gothic Compressed No.8, (10-72pt), ATF 1653
  - Gothic Compressed Title No.8, (8-60pt), ATF 1649
- Greeting Card, (10-24pt) ATF 1683
  - Greeting Card Light, (10-24pt) ATF 1684

=== H ===
- Handcraft, (6-72pt) ATF 1686
  - Handcraft Title, (6-60pt) ATF 1687
  - Handcraft Wide Title, (6-30pt) ATF 1688

=== I, J ===
- Invitation Text, (6-48pt), desin: Robert Wiebking 1914, ATF 1693
- Japanet, (8-48pt) original name: Wedge Gothic cut in 1893 by BB&S for the Chicago Herald, renamed in 1925, Recast for the ATF in 1954: ATF 1694
- Morris Jensonian, (6-48pt) ATF 1790
  - Poor revival of the type of William Morris, 1895-96 first named: Mazarin, later replaced by the Inland's face: Klemscott and renamed.

=== K ===
- Kenilworth Italic, (6-48pt) first: Inland Type Foundry 1904, similar to: Cheltenham Oldstyle, BB&S bought the italic matrices, these ended as ATF 1695

=== L ===
- Latin Antique, (6-48pt), ATF 1697
  - Latin Condensed, (10-72pt), ATF 1698
  - Latin Expanded, (6-48pt), ATF 1699
  - Latin Lightface, (6-48pt), ATF 1700
  - Latin Oldstyle Bold, (6-72pt), ATF 1703
  - Light Modern, (24-48pt), ATF 1745
- Law Italic No.5, (8-14pt)

=== M ===
- Mazerin No.5, (6-60pt)
  - Mazerin Italic, (6-48pt)
- Missal Text, (8-36pt)
- Mission, (6-48pt), design: Sidney Gaunt in 1905, patented by: George Oswald Ottley, ATF 1778
- Modern Gothic, (5-96pt), 1897, ATF 1662
  - Modern Gothic Italic, (5-72pt), ATF 1665
  - Modern Condensed Gothic, (6-72pt), ATF 1663
  - Modern Condensed Gothic Title, (6-120pt), ATF 1664
- Modern No.4 and Italic, (6-12pt)
- Modern Roman Bold Condensed, (Lining Aldine), (6-48pt), ATF 1781
  - Modern Roman Bold Extra Condensed, (Lining Aldine Condensed),(6-48pt), ATF 1781
  - Modern Roman Condensed, (Condensed No. 54), (5-48pt), ATF 1782
  - Modern Roman Extra Condensed, (Extra Condensed No. 56),(6-48pt), ATF 1783
  - Modern Roman Italic, (6-12pt), (Title Italic No.19), ATF 1784
  - Modern Roman Lightface, (Lightface No.7), (6-48pt), ATF 1785
  - Modern Roman Medium, (5-48pt), (Title No.5), ATF 1786
  - Modern Roman Wide, (6-16pt.), (Expanded No.5 or Title Expanded), ATF 1787
  - Modern Roman No.64 and Italic, (5-18pt), ATF 1916, ATF 1914
  - Modern Roman No.80 and Italic, (5-12pt), ATF 1918, ATF 1915
- Modern Text, (6-36pt), design: Robert Wiebking (?) ~1913, ATF 1788
- Morris Romanized Black, (6-60pt), introduced as Tell Text in 1895, adaptation of the Troy- and Chaucer types of William Morris, renamed in 1925, ATF 1791
- Murder Venezian, (6-72pt), ATF 1795, design: Robert Wiebking, first shown as: Laclede Oldstyle (1922) by the Laclede Type Foundry in St. Louis
  - Murder Italic,(6-72pt), ATF 1794
  - Murder Bold, (6-72pt), ATF 1792
  - Murder Bold Italic, (6-72pt), ATF 1793

=== O ===
- Old Roman or Caslon Old Roman, (6-72pt), ATF 1840,
  - Old Roman Itallic or Caslon Old Roman Italic, (6-48pt), ATF 1810,
  - Old Roman Condensed, (6-72pt), ATF 1809
  - Old Roman Bold, (6-72pt), ATF 1807
  - Old Roman Bold Condensed, (6-120pt), ATF 1808
  - Old Roman Black, (6-72pt), ATF 1805
  - Old Roman Black Italic, (6-48pt), ATF 1807
  - Old Roman Semitone, (18-60pt), ATF 1811

=== P ===
- Pantograph Script, (12-60pt), ATF 1816, upright script introduced in 1893, but shown as late as 1925
- Paragon later: Paragon Plate, (6-24pt), ATF 1817, introduced in 1901
  - Paragon Italic or Paragon Plate Italic, (6-24pt), ATF 1818, sloped version of the roman
  - Program Italic, offered as a title-version, (6s-24L) ATF 1848
  - Pagram Italic, offered as a title-version, (6s-24L) ATF 1848
- Parsons, (6-72pt), ATF 1819, design: Will Ransom (1917), named after I. R. Parsons, a Chicago advertising manager
  - Parsons Italic, (6-48pt), (1918), ATF 1821,
  - Parsons Bold, (6-72pt), (1918), ATF 1820,
  - Parsons Swash Initials, (18-48pt), design: Sidney Gaunt, 1918
- Pastel, (6-72pt), ATF 1822, design: 1892 by Nicolas J. Werner and Gustav Schroeder first named Era, Lightface Era and Era Open were added in 1895, Era Condensed about 1898.
  - Pastel Condensed, (8-72pt) ATF 1824
  - Offset Pastel Condensed, (24-72pt), ATF 1801
  - Pastel Lightface, (6-72pt), ATF 1825
  - Pastel Bold, (5-72pt), ATF 1823
  - Pastel Open, (12-60pt), ATF 1826
- Pekin, (18,30pt) ATF 1827, original name Dormer patented by Great Western Typefoundry in 1888, design: Ernst Lauschke
- Pencraft Oldstyle, (6-72pt), ATF 1829, design: Sidney Gaunt 1914,
  - Pencraft Title, (6s-42pt), ATF 1834
  - Pencraft Italic, (6-48pt), ATF 1828
  - Pencraft Oldstyle Bold, (6-72pt), ATF 1830
  - Pencraft Oldstyle Bold Condensed, (6-72pt), ATF 1831
  - Pencraft Shaded, (24-48pt), ATF 1832
  - Pencraft Text, (12-48pt) ATF 1833, design: Sidney Gaunt 1916,
- Plate Gothic, (6s-36pt), ATF 1836
  - Plate Gothic Condensed, (6s-36pt), ATF 1838
  - Plate Gothic Light, (6s-36pt), ATF 1839
  - Plate Gothic Light Condensed, (6s-36pt), ATF 1840
  - Plate Gothic Bold, (6s-12pt), ATF 1837
- Plate Script, (14-48pt), ATF 1841, three sets of lowercase:
- Plate Script No.2, (14-48pt), ATF 1852
- Plate Script No.3, (14-48pt), ATF 1853
- Plate Text, (8-18pt)
  - Plate Text No.2,
  - Plate Text No.3,
  - Plate Text No.4, (8-36pt)
- Pompeian Cursive, (12-54pt), design: Oswald Cooper 1927, not shown in the ATF books
- Priory Black Text, (8-48pt), ATF 1847, earlier name: Reed Text
- Publicity Gothic, (6-120pt), ATF 1849, design: Sidney Gaunt, 1916

=== R ===
- Rugged Bold, (6-72pt) first named: Talisman, patented by: Sidney Gaunt in 1903, after 1911 renamed to Rugged Bold.
  - Rugged Bold Italic, (6-72pt), first named Talisman Italic, patented by: Sidney Gaunt in 1904, after 1911 renamed to Rugged Bold Italic. (6-72pt)
  - Rugged Lightface, (8-48pt) ATF 1501, first named Carlton later Adcraft Lightface,
  - Rugged Medium, (6-72pt) ATF 1502, first: Alfred Medium later Adcraft Medium
  - Rugged Black, (6-120pt), first: Plymouth
  - Rugged Black Italic, (6-72pt), first: Plymouth Italic
  - Rugged Black Condensed, (6-72pt), first: Plymouth Condensed
  - Rugged Extra Black, (6-72pt), ATF 1500, first: Plymouth Bold and Adcraft Black

=== S ===
- Scotch Roman, (6-48pt), ATF 1856
- Sketch Circular, (8-14pt) ATF 1859, design: Ed Newman,
  - Sketch Title, (6s-30pt), ATF 1560, (1890), first named: Racine, only capitals, used for announcements. Both series lasted into the late 1920s.
- Spire No.5, (12-72pt), ATF 1861, cut around 1898, bold and condensed face
- Steelplate Gothic Extralight, (6s-24L), ATF 1874, Design: Robert Wiebking
  - Steelplate Gothic Light, (6s-24L), ATF 1867
  - Steelplate Gothic Light Condensed, (6s-24L), ATF 1869
  - Steelplate Gothic Light Extended, (6s-24L), ATF 1865
  - Steelplate Gothic Heavy, (6s-24L), ATF 1868
  - Steelplate Gothic Heavy Condensed, (6s-24L), ATF 1870
  - Steelplate Gothic Heavy Extended, (6s-24L), ATF 1866
  - Steelplate Gothic Bold, (6s-24L), ATF 1873
  - Steelplate Gothic Shaded, (6s-24L), ATF 1872, (1918), in England known as: Spartan Outline
- Stillson, (6s-36pt), introduced around 1899, patented in 1900 by R. L. Stillson
- Swagger Capitals or: Swagger Initials, (36pt), design: Carl S. Junge 1925, elongated flourish scripts, without X and Z. To be used with various typefaces.

=== T ===
- Ternholm Oldstyle, (6-72pt), ATF 1886, design: George F. Trenholm around 1925–1927, after 1929, when BB&S merged with ATF, there is no evidence these matrices were used to cast. Although they were listed in the ATF vaults.
  - Ternholm Cursive, (6-48pt), ATF 1885,
  - Ternholm Bold, (6-96pt), ATF 1884,
  - Ternholm Shaded Capitals, (12-48pt), ATF 1887,
- Typewriter faces:
  - Bernhart Utility Typewriter, ATF 1894
  - Improved Typewriter, ATF 1895
  - Oliver Printype Typewriter, ATF 1897
  - Oliver Standard Silk Typewriter, ATF 1898
  - Remington Typewriter, ATF 1899
  - Silk Remington Typewriter, ATF 1900
  - Reproduction Typewriter, ATF 1902
  - Smith Premier Silk Typewriter, ATF 1903
  - Underwood New Model Silk Typewriter, ATF 1904
  - Yost Typewriter, ATF 1768

=== W ===
- Waldorf Text, (14-36pt), ATF 1905, shaded Old English face
- Wedding plate Script, (14-36pt), ATF 1908, design: Sidney Gaunt 1904
- Woodward, (6-60pt), ATF 1608, designed for Inland Type Foundry in 1894 by William A. Schraustädter, named for a Saint Louis printer. In 1911 Inland was taken over by ATF, the equipment was divided between ATF and BB&S. Some time later this face was renamed by BB&S as DeVinne Recut and DeVinne Recut Outline
  - Woodward Outline, (12-60pt), ATF 1609
- World Gothic, (6-72pt), design: Robert Wiebking
  - World Gothic Italic, (6-72pt), in 1898 introduced as": Dewey No.51, after Admiral George Dewey
  - World Gothic Condensed, (6-96pt), in 1897 shown as: Topic No.5
