= Trennert Type Foundry =

Schriftgiesserei J.D. Trennert & Sohn
- Company type: Aktiengesellschaft
- Industry: Type foundry
- Headquarters: Altona, Prussia, Germany

J. D. Trennert and Son was a German type foundry established in Altona.

== Typefaces ==
The following foundry types were issued by the Trennert foundry:

- Fortuna (1930, Friedrich Bauer)
- Friedrich-Bauer-Grotesk (before 1936, Friedrich Bauer), in addition to a basic face, there were three other versions, halbfette, fette, and an in-line version, lichte. Also cast by Genzsch & Heyse, A.G.
- Potsdam Schnitt (before 1936), four versions, magerer, halbfetter, fetter, and schmal-halbfetter.
- Rheingold (1936, Erich Mollowitz), in two weights, magerer and fetter. Later copied by Weber as Forelle and by Stephenson Blake as Mercury.
- Trennert (1926–27, Friedrich Bauer), in addition to a basic face, there is an italic (with swash capitals), a semi-bold, a bold, and a bold condensed.
