= Inland Type Foundry =

American type foundry

- Company type: Private
- Industry: Type foundry
- Founded: January 2, 1894; 132 years ago
- Defunct: 1911; 115 years ago
- Headquarters: Saint Louis, Missouri
- Key people: William A. Schraubstadter, Oswald Schraubstadter, Carl Schraubstadter Jr.

The Inland Type Foundry was an American type foundry established in 1894 in Saint Louis, Missouri and later with branch offices in Chicago and New York City. Although it was founded to compete directly with the "type trust" (American Type Founders), and was consistently profitable, it was eventually sold to ATF.

== History ==
Inland was founded by the three sons of Carl Schraubstadter, one of the owners of the Central Type Foundry which had shut down upon being sold to American Type Founders (ATF) in 1892. William A. Schraubstadter had been superintendent of the old foundry and, not being offered a similar position in the consolidation, founded Inland with his two brothers, Oswald and Carl Jr. At first the foundry sold type made by the Keystone Type Foundry and the Great Western Type Foundry, but soon enough was cutting and casting faces of their own. All three brothers were familiar with the foundry business and quite soon the firm began making type that was "state of the art," being point-set and having a common base-line for all faces of the same body size. This last feature was a recent innovation and, as Inland had no back stock of non-linging faces, they advertised this heavily as "Standard Line Type."

Two magazines, Practical Printer and Printers' Wit & Humor were published by the firm in order to showcase their type. In 1897 Inland bought out the Western Engravers' Supply Company of St. Louis. In 1911 the brothers sold the foundry to ATF, which divided the matrices between their own facility in Jersey City and that of their subsidiary Barnhart Brothers & Spindler in Chicago. While the other two brothers simply retired, Oswald Schraubstadter worked for ATF for many years.

Inland was arguably the most successful American type foundry, certainly the most successful of its day. Several factors were responsible for this including the experience and capability of the Schraubstadter brothers, a well designed high-quality product, an aggressive program of direct mail advertising, and reduced transport costs due to both the closeness of lead mines and the concentration of the printing industry in the Midwest and Tennessee. Another factor in their success might have been widespread resentment among printers of the "type trust," represented by ATF.

== Typefaces ==
Inland, alone among foundries, often named their type faces after prominent customers. Studley, for instance, was named after Robert P. Studley, a St. Louis lithographer. The following foundry types were issued by Inland:

- Alfred (1909), later sold by BB&S as Adcraft Medium
- Antique No. 1 (1906*)
- Antique Latin (1906*)
- Avil (1904)
- Becker (1899)
- Blair (1900), later sold by ATF, also copied by Hansen as Card Gothic No. 2.
- Blanchard series (1900)
- Bold Litho (1909)
- Brandon (1898, Nicholas J. Werner), later sold by ATF, also copied by Hansen as Plate Roman, while both Linotype and Intertype called their versions Bold Face No. 9.
- Brandon Gothic, later sold by ATF.
- Bruce Title (1896, Nicholas J. Werner), also known as Lining Menu, later sold by BB&S as Menu Title
- Burford Initials (1906*)
- Caledonian Italic (1906*), a stand alone italic in no way related to Dwiggins Caledonia, virtually identical to Marder, Luse's Law Italic.
- Caslon Series
  - Caslon Old Style Roman (1900), cast from William Caslon's original matrices licensed from Stephenson Blake, other Inland Caslons were of their own design.
  - Caslon Old Style Italic (1901)
  - New Caslon (1905), copied by Intertype Corporation and Linotype as Caslon No. 3, and later sold by ATF. ATF's American Caslon is derived from this design.
  - New Caslon Italic + Heavy Caslon (1906)
  - Recut Caslon (1907)
  - Condensed Caslon (1907), copied by Monotype and later sold by ATF.
- Comstock (1902, William A. Schraubstädter), matrices for machine composition later offered by Lanston Monotype, copied by Bauer as Astoria, revived by ATF in 1957.
- Condensed Gothic No. 5 (1899)
- Condensed Gothic No. 10 (1904)
- Condensed Litho (1908)
- Condensed Title Gothic No. 11 (1905)
- Condensed Title Herald Gothic (1909)
- Condensed Title Star Gothic (1909)
- Compressed Litho (1911)
- Corbit (1900, Nicholas J. Werner), later sold by ATF.
  - Condensed Corbit (1902), later sold by ATF.
- Cosmopolitan (1895)
- Courts (1900, Nicholas J. Werner), later sold first by BB&S and then by ATF as DeVinne Recut Italic
- Dorsey (1904), later sold by ATF.
  - Light Dorsey + italic + Condensed Dorsey (1910), later sold by ATF.
- Drew (1910), later sold by ATF.
- Edwards (1897, Nicholas J. Werner), later sold first by BB&S and then by ATF as Bizarre Bold
- Extended Old Style (1895)
- Extra Condensed Gothic No. 1 (1905)
- Extra Condensed Title Gothic No. 12 (1905)
- Faust (1905), an imitation of ATF's Tiffany.
- Fraktur (1906*)
- Francis (1904)
- French Old Style (1906*)
- French Script (1905)
- Foster (1905)
- Haight (1902, A.V. Haight)
- Havens (1902)
- Hammond Typewriter (1907)
- Hearst (1902), Frederic Goudy claimed that this had been copied from lettering he had done for a book of verses for children, and it is similar to his Pabst Roman.
- Inland (1895, Nicholas J. Werner)
- Inland Copperplate (1906*), in no way relate to Copperplate Gothic.
- Ionic (1906*)
- Invitation Script (1896)
- Iroquois (1895, Nicholas J. Werner)
- Kelmscott (1897), later sold by BB&S as Morris Jensonian
- Kenilworth (1904), an imitation of Cheltenham.
- Light Litho (1909)
- Light Litho Gothic (1910)
- Litho Antique (1910)
- Litho Gothic + Offset Light Litho Gothic (1911)
- Litho Roman + Title Litho Roman (1907)
- Manilla (1906*)
- Matthews (1901)
- MacFarland (1897), originally sold by Genzsch & Heyse as Römische Antiqua, and later sold by A.D. Farmer & Son as Bradford, matrices for machine composition later offered by Lanston Monotype.
- McClure (1902)
- McNally (1905)
- Mitchell (1906)
- Old Style No. 11 (1899), Old Styles eight through fourteen were shown in the 1906 Specimen Book.
- Old Style No. 13 (1899), matrices supplied by Mergenthaler Linotype who called it Old Style No. 1
- Oliver Print Type (1911), made from punches supplied by the Oliver Typewriter Company.
- Osborne (1906*)
- Palmer Script (1899), later sold by BB&S as Stationers Semiscript
- Pen Print + Bold Pen Print (1911), later sold by Stephenson Blake and ATF, with matrices for machine composition available from Intertype.
- Preerorius (1895)
- Remington Typewriter Elite + No. 1 (1906*)
- Rogers (1902)
- Roman numbers twenty through twenty-nine were shown in the 1906 Specimen Book.
- Saint John + Outline (1895), taken from lettering by Will Bradley.
- Schwabacher]] (1906*)
- Shaw Text (1907)
- Skinner (1896, either John K. Robers or Nicholas J. Werner), later sold by BB&S as Menu Roman
- Slope Gothic Title (1906*)
- Smith Premier Typewriter No. 1 (1906*)
- Studley (1897)
  - Extended Studley (1899)
- Title Gothic Slope (1895)
- Title Shaded Litho (1911)
- Webb (1905)
- Underwood Typewriter (1908), made from punches supplied by the Underwood Typewriter Company.
- Winchell (1903, Edward Everett Winchell), matrices for machine composition later offered by Lanston Monotype.
  - Condensed Winchell (1904)
- Woodward
  - Woodward (1894, William A. Schraubstädter), an imitation of Central Type's De Vinne, later sold first by BB&S and then by ATF as DeVinne Recut
  - Condensed Woodward + Extended + Poster (1897)
