= List of Apple typefaces =

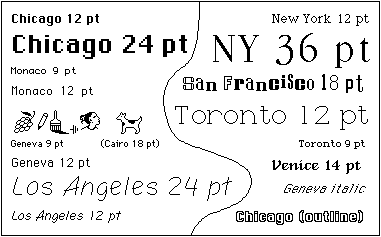

This is a list of typefaces made by/for Apple Inc.

== Serif ==
=== Proportional ===
- Apple Garamond (1983), designed to replace Motter Tektura in the Apple logo. Not included on Macs in a user-available form.
- New York (1984, by Susan Kare), a serif font.
- Toronto (1984, Susan Kare)
- Athens (1984, Susan Kare), slab serif.
- Hoefler Text (1991, Jonathan Hoefler), still included with every Mac. Four-member family with an ornament font.
- Espy Serif (1993, bitmapped font, dropped with Mac OS 8)
- Fancy (1993), Apple Newton font based on Times Roman
- New York (2019), a new design unrelated to the earlier typeface of the same name. Designed to work with San Francisco. Available in four optical sizes: extra large, large, medium, and small.

== Sans-serif ==
=== Proportional ===
- Chicago (1984 by Susan Kare, pre-Mac OS 8 system font, also used by early iPods)
- Geneva (1984 by Susan Kare), sans-serif font inspired by Helvetica. Converted to TrueType format and still installed on Macs.
- Espy Sans (1993, EWorld, Apple Newton and iPod Mini font, known as System on the Apple Newton platform)
- System (1993, see Espy Sans)
- eWorld Tight (1993), EWorld font based on Helvetica Compressed
- Simple (1993), Apple Newton font, based on Geneva
- Skia (1993 Matthew Carter), demonstration of QuickDraw GX typography in the style of inscriptions from antiquity. Still installed on Macs.
- Charcoal (1999), by David Berlow, Mac OS 8 system font)
- Lucida Grande (2000) by Charles Bigelow and Kris Holmes, used in OS X)
- San Francisco (2014), the new system font on Apple Watch and other Apple devices from winter 2015, now since 2017 Apple's corporate font.
- Myriad (Apple's corporate font (until 2017) and used by the iPod photo), not installed on Macs in a user-accessible format. Designed by Robert Slimbach and Carol Twombly.

=== Monospaced ===
- Monaco (1984, Susan Kare) Bitmap, later converted to TrueType. Still included with Macs, but default monospace typeface is now Menlo.
- Menlo (2009, Jim Lyles), based on the open-source font Bitstream Vera.
- SF Mono (2017, Apple), monospaced variant of the San Francisco font introduced in 2015.

== Script and handwritten ==
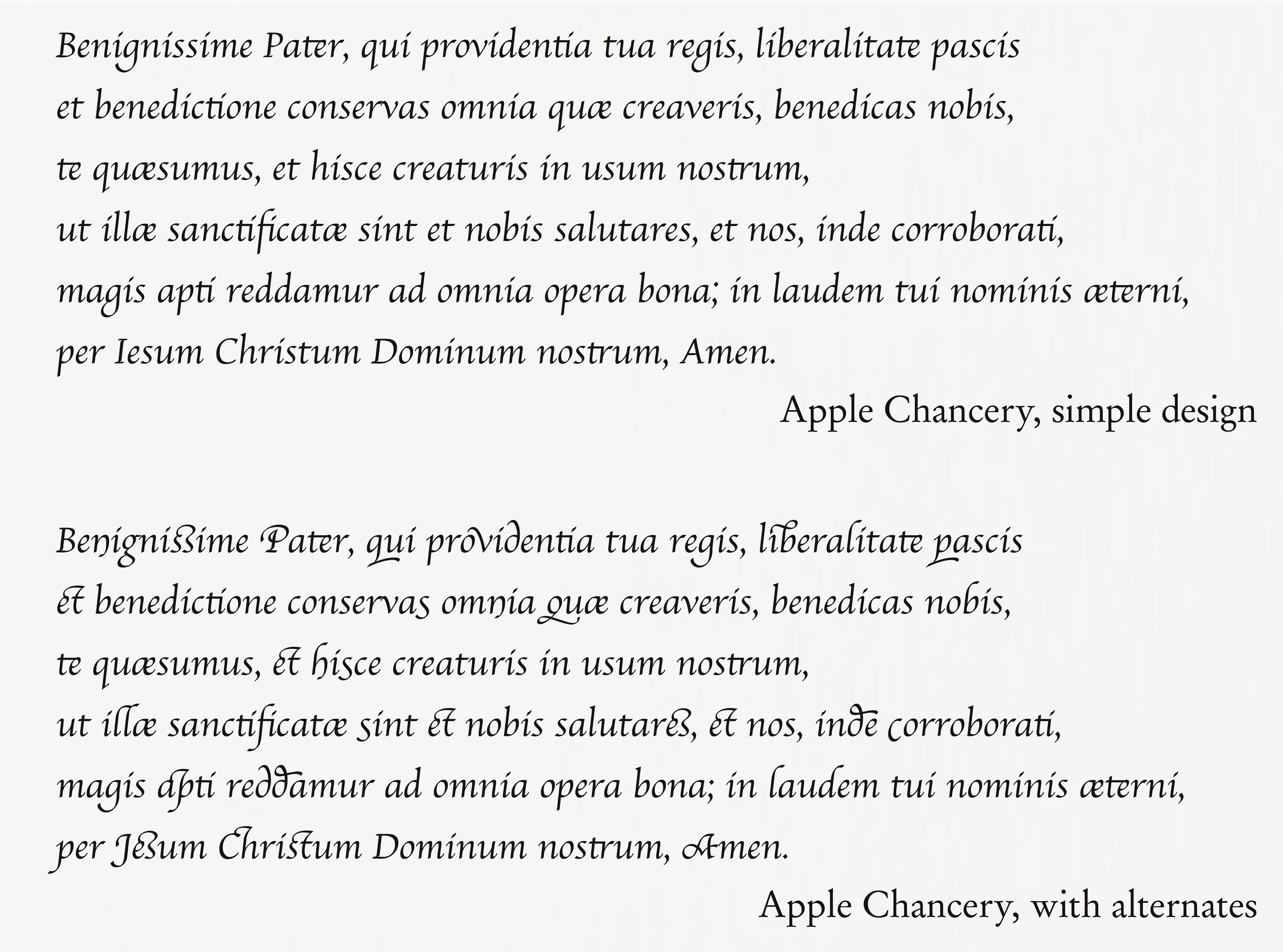
Apple Chancery by Kris Holmes, commissioned by Apple in 1993. Holmes had been taught calligraphy at Reed College, by the same tutors as Steve Jobs (though not at the same time). The font's goal was to include complex alternates to somewhat mimic the verve of Renaissance scribes.

- Venice (1984, Bill Atkinson), bitmap script inspired by chancery cursive. Never converted to TrueType format.
- Los Angeles (1984, Susan Kare), bitmap casual script font. Never converted to TrueType format.
- Apple Casual (1993, used on Apple Newton)
- Apple Chancery (1993, Kris Holmes), a test-bed for contextual alternates in font programming. Still installed on Macs.

== Miscellaneous ==
- Apple Symbols (2003, Unicode symbol/dingbat font)
- Cairo (1984 by Susan Kare, a dingbat font best known for the dogcow in the 0x7A (lowercase Z) position)
- LastResort (2001 by Michael Everson, Mac OS X Fallback font)
- London (1984, Susan Kare), bitmap blackletter. Never converted to TrueType format.
- San Francisco (1984, Susan Kare), bitmap font in a 'ransom note' style. Never converted to TrueType format.

== See also ==
- List of macOS fonts
- Fonts on Macintosh
- Typography of Apple Inc.
