= Fonts on Macintosh =

Apple's Macintosh computer supports a wide variety of fonts. This support was one of the features that initially distinguished it from other systems.

== Fonts ==
=== System fonts ===
The primary system font in OS X El Capitan and above is San Francisco. OS X Yosemite used Helvetica Neue, and preceding versions largely employed Lucida Grande. For labels and other small text, 10 pt Lucida Grande was typically used. Lucida Grande is almost identical in appearance to the prevalent Windows font Lucida Sans, and contains a larger variety of glyphs.

MacOS ships with multiple typefaces, for multiple scripts, licensed from several sources. MacOS includes Roman, Japanese and Chinese fonts. It also supports sophisticated font techniques, such as ligatures and filtering.

Many of the classic Macintosh typefaces included with previous versions remained available, including the serif typefaces New York, Palatino, and Times, the sans-serif Charcoal and Chicago, Monaco, Geneva and Helvetica. Courier, a monospaced font, also remained.

In the initial publicly released version of Mac OS X (March 2001), font support for scripts was limited to Lucida Grande and a few fonts for the major Japanese scripts. With each major revision of the OS, fonts supporting additional scripts were added.

=== Zapfino ===
Demonstration of alternate letters, including the full-word ligature for the name of the Zapfino typeface

Zapfino is a calligraphic typeface designed by and named after renowned typeface designer Hermann Zapf for Linotype. Zapfino utilizes advanced typographic features of the Apple Advanced Typography (AAT) "morx" table format and is included in OS X partially as a technology demo. Ligatures and character variations are extensively used. The font is based on a calligraphic example by Zapf in 1944. The version included with macOS is a single weight. Since then, Linotype has introduced “Linotype Zapfino Extra” which includes the additional “Forte” weight with more options and alternates.

Several of the GX fonts that Apple commissioned and originally shipped with System 7.5 were ported to use AAT and shipped with Mac OS X 10.2 and 10.3. Hoefler Text, Apple Chancery and Skia are examples of fonts of this heritage. Other typefaces were licensed from the general offerings of leading font vendors.

=== LastResort ===
Sample glyphs from the LastResort font

The LastResort font is invisible to the end user, but is used by the system to display reference glyphs in the event that glyphs needed to display a given character are not found in any other available font. The symbols provided by the LastResort font place glyphs into categories based on their location in the Unicode system and provide a hint to the user about which font or script is required to view unavailable characters. Designed by Apple and extended by Michael Everson of Evertype for Unicode 4.1 coverage, the symbols adhere to a unified design. The glyphs are square with rounded corners with a bold outline. On the left and right sides of the outline, the Unicode range that the character belongs to is given using hexadecimal digits. Top and bottom are used for one or two descriptions of the Unicode block name. A symbol representative of the block is centered inside the square. The typeface used for the text cutouts in the outline is Chicago, otherwise not included with macOS. LastResort has been part of Mac OS since version 8.5, but the limited success of Apple Type Services for Unicode Imaging (ATSUI) on the classic Mac OS means that only users of macOS are regularly exposed to it.

=== Lucida Grande ===
Of the fonts that ship with macOS, Lucida Grande has the broadest character repertoire. This font includes most of the Arabic, Roman, Cyrillic, Hebrew, Thai and Greek letters and an assortment of common symbols. All in all, it contains a bit more than 2800 glyphs (including ligatures).

In Mac OS X 10.3 ("Panther"), a font called Apple Symbols was introduced. It complements the set of symbols from Lucida Grande, but also contains glyphs only accessible by glyph ID (that is, they have not been assigned Unicode code points). A hidden font called Keyboard contains 92 visible glyphs, most of which appear on Apple keyboards.

== Font management ==
=== System 6.0.8 and earlier ===
Originally, the Macintosh QuickDraw system software supported only bitmapped fonts. The original font set was custom designed for the Macintosh and was intended to provide on-screen legibility. These system fonts were named after large cities, e.g. New York, Chicago, and Geneva. (See Fonts of the Original Macintosh.)

Bitmapped fonts were stored as resources within the System file. A utility called Font/DA Mover was used to install fonts into or remove fonts from the System file. Fonts could be embedded into Macintosh applications and other file types, such as a HyperCard stack. Unused fonts were stored in a suitcase file.

The ImageWriter printer supported a higher resolution mode where bitmap fonts with twice the screen resolution were automatically substituted for 'near letter quality' printing. (For example, a 24-point bitmapped font would be used for 12-point printing.) This feature was sometimes called two-times font printing. Some later Apple QuickDraw–based laser printers supported four-times font printing for letter quality output.

With the introduction of the LaserWriter and support for PostScript-compatible printers, the Mac system software initially supported outline fonts for printing only. These outline fonts could be printed in letter quality at any size. PostScript fonts came with two files; a bitmap font was installed into the System file, and an outline font file was stored in the System Folder. Some of the bitmapped “city” fonts were automatically replaced by PostScript fonts by the printer driver. Commercial typefaces such as Times and Helvetica began to be distributed by Apple, Adobe Systems and others.

The Adobe Type Manager (ATM) system extension allowed PostScript outline fonts to be displayed on screen and used with all printers (PostScript or not). This allowed for true WYSIWYG printing in a much broader set of circumstances than the base system software, however with a noticeable speed penalty, especially on Motorola 68000–based machines.

After the release of System 7, Apple added System 6 support for TrueType outline fonts through a freely available system extension, providing functionality similar to ATM. Apple provided TrueType outline files for the bitmapped 'city' system fonts, allowing letter quality WYSIWYG printing.

A reboot was required after installing new fonts unless using a font management utility such as Suitcase, FontJuggler or MasterJuggler.

=== System 7 – Mac OS 9 ===
A highly touted feature of System 7 was integrated TrueType outline font support, which received industry support from Microsoft. Fonts were still stored in the System file but could be installed using drag-and-drop. To install new fonts, one had to quit all applications.

Despite this, ATM and PostScript Type 1 fonts continued to be widely used, especially for professional desktop publishing. Eventually Adobe released a free version of their utility, called ATM Light.

In System 7.1, a separate Fonts folder appeared in the System Folder. Fonts were automatically installed when dropped on the System Folder, and became available to applications after they were restarted. Font resources were generally grouped in suitcase files. However, rules for storing printer fonts varied greatly between different system, printer and application configurations until the advent of the new Fonts folder. Typically, they had to be stored directly in the System Folder or in the Extensions Folder.

System 7.5 added the QuickDraw GX graphics engine. TrueType GX supported ligatures and other advanced typography features. However little software supported these features and PostScript remained the standard.

Starting with Mac OS 8.5, the operating system supported data fork fonts, including Windows TrueType and OpenType. In addition, Apple created a new format, called data-fork suitcases. At the same time, support was added for TrueType collection files, conventionally with the filename extension .ttc.

System versions 7 to 9 supported a maximum of 128 font suitcases, each storing multiple fonts.

Starting with version 7.1, Apple unified the implementation of non-roman script systems in a programming interface called WorldScript. WorldScript I was used for all one-byte character sets and WorldScript II for two-byte sets. Support for new script systems was added by so-called Language Kits. Some kits were provided with the system software, and others were sold by Apple and third parties. Application support for WorldScript was not universal, since support was a significant task. Good international support gave a marketing edge to word-processing programs such as Nisus Writer and programs using the WASTE text engine, since Microsoft Word was not WorldScript aware.

Beginning in 1996, Apple included Microsoft's Core fonts for the Web, which included common Windows fonts as well as new ones, resolving cross-platform font issues. In 8.5, full Unicode support was added to Mac OS through an API called ATSUI. However, WorldScript remained the dominant technology for international text on the classic MacOS, because few applications used ATSUI.

=== Mac OS X / macOS ===
Mac OS X / macOS 10.x supports a wide variety of font formats. It supports most of the font formats used on earlier systems, where the fonts were typically stored in the resource fork of the file. In addition to the data-fork version of TrueType and the Adobe/Microsoft OpenType fonts, Mac OS X also supports Apple's own data-fork-based TrueType format, called data-fork suitcases with the filename extension .dfont. Data-fork suitcases are old-style Mac TrueType fonts with all the data from the resource fork transferred unchanged to the data fork. The system also supports the instances created using the "multiple master" PostScript variant.

Fonts in the /System/Library/Fonts folder and the /Library/Fonts folder are available to all users. Fonts stored in a user's ~/Library/Fonts folder are available to only that user. Previously, up to Mac OS X 10.4, both Mac OS 9 applications running in the legacy Classic Environment and native applications could access fonts stored in the Mac OS 9 system folder

macOS includes a software rasterizer that supports PostScript. Thus eliminating the need for the Adobe Type Manager Light program. The built-in text editing supports advanced typesetting features such as adjustable kerning and baseline, as well as a few OpenType features.

Support for QuickDraw GX fonts was dropped in macOS in favor of TrueType fonts using AAT features. Bitmap fonts are only used on screen if there is a corresponding vector form (which is always used in printing).

Since Mac OS X Panther, a utility called Font Book has been included with the operating system allowing users to easily install fonts and do basic font management.

In Mac OS X Snow Leopard (2009), Apple abandoned its proprietary .dfont format, instead bundling many fonts in the TrueType Collection format which was supported since Mac OS 8.5.

=== Third-party font managers ===
As desktop publishing took off and PostScript and other outline font formats joined the bitmap fonts, the need for unified font management grew. A number of third parties have created tools, such as Suitcase, for managing font sets. For example, they allowed enabling or disabling fonts on-the-fly, and storing fonts outside of their normal locations. Some even allow the use of Windows .ttf font files natively on systems prior to macOS.

== Font technology ==
=== TrueType and PostScript ===
TrueType is an outline font standard developed by Apple in the late 1980s, and later licensed to Microsoft, as a competitor to Adobe's Type 1 fonts used in PostScript, which dominated desktop publishing.

The outlines of the characters in TrueType fonts are made of straight line segments and quadratic Bézier curves, rather than the cubic Bézier curves in Type 1 fonts. While the underlying mathematics of TrueType is thus simpler, many type developers prefer to work with cubic curves because they are easier to draw and edit.

While earlier versions of the Mac OS required additional software to work with Type 1 fonts (as well as at least one bitmap copy of each Type 1 font to be used), macOS now includes native support for a variety of font technologies, including both TrueType and PostScript Type 1.

Microsoft, together with Adobe, created an extended TrueType format, called OpenType. Apple, however, continued to develop TrueType. A Zapf table, for example, maps composite glyphs to characters and vice versa and adds other features. The table was named after typeface creator Hermann Zapf with permission.

=== QuickDraw GX ===
QuickDraw GX was a complete overhaul of the Macintosh graphics system, including the font system, which was rolled out for System 7.5 in 1995. QuickDraw GX fonts could be in either TrueType or PostScript Type 1 formats and included additional information about the glyphs and their purpose. Advanced features, such as ligatures, glyph variations, kerning information and small caps, could be used by any GX enabled application. Previously, they had typically been reserved for advanced typesetting applications.

Microsoft was refused a license to GX technology and chose to develop OpenType instead. GX typography and GX technology as a whole never saw widespread adoption. Support for GX was dropped in later versions.

AAT covers much of the same ground as OpenType. It incorporates concepts from the Multiple Master font format, which allows multiple axes of traits to be defined and an n-dimensional number of glyphs to be accessible within that space. AAT features do not alter the underlying characters, but do affect their representation during glyph conversion.

AAT is supported in IBM’s open source ICU library, which implements support for AAT fonts under Linux and other open source operating systems.

=== Hinting technology ===
Hinting is the process by which TrueType fonts are adjusted to the limited resolution of a screen or a relatively low resolution printer. Undesired features in the rendered text, such as lack of symmetry or broken strokes, can be reduced. Hinting is performed by a virtual machine that distorts the control points that define the glyph shapes so that they fit the grid defined by the screen better. Hinting is particularly important when rendering text at low effective resolution: that is, with few pixels per character.

Hinting is part of the TrueType specification, but Apple held three patents in the United States relating to the process:

- US 5155805 "Method and apparatus for moving control points in displaying digital typeface on raster output devices" (filed May 8, 1989)
- US 5159668 "Method and apparatus for manipulating outlines in improving digital typeface on raster output devices" (filed May 8, 1989)
- US 5325479 "Method and apparatus for moving control points in displaying digital typeface on raster output devices" (filed May 28, 1992)

Until they expired, Apple offered licensing of these patents. Microsoft had access to Apple's TrueType patents through cross-licensing. These patents have proven problematic to developers and vendors of open source software for TrueType rendering, such as FreeType. To avoid infringing on the patents, some software disregarded the hinting information present in fonts, resulting in visual artefacts. FreeType developed an automatic hinting engine, but it is difficult to beat the explicit hinting guidelines provided by the typeface designer. The problem of lacking hinting could also be compensated for by using anti-aliasing, although a combination of the two produces the best result.

=== Subpixel rendering ===
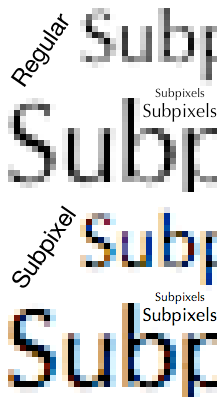
A sample of text rendered by the Quartz engine in macOS, using traditional and subpixel rendering. Expanded version, with explanations.

Mac OS X / macOS uses subpixel rendering. Version 10.2 introduced subpixel rendering of type and Quartz vector graphics. This feature is enabled using the System Preferences panel "General" (10.2) or "Appearance" (10.3), by setting the font smoothing style to "Medium — best for Flat Panel". Mac OS X 10.4 introduced an "Automatic" setting which transparently chooses either "Medium" or "Standard," depending on the type of main display. The quality of the rendering compared to Microsoft's ClearType and FreeType is contested, and is largely a matter of reader preference. However, Apple's approach differs from that of ClearType and FreeType in that TrueType hinting instructions are discarded for all but the smallest type sizes. This results in more consistency of rendering on Mac OS at the expense of allowing type designers a level of fine tuning through hints.

== Fonts of the original Macintosh ==
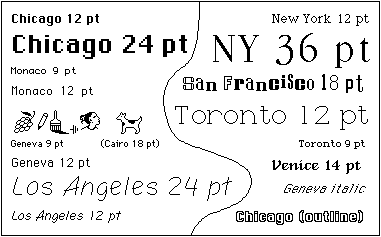

Approximately 12 fonts were included with the classic Mac OS (versions 1–9). With the sole exception of Bill Atkinson's Venice typeface, the fonts included with the original Macintosh were designed by Susan Kare, who also designed most of the Macintosh's original icons.

The Macintosh was an early example of a mainstream computer using fonts featuring characters of different widths, often referred to as proportional fonts. Previously, most computer systems were limited to using monospaced fonts, requiring, for example, i and m to be exactly the same width. Vector-based fonts had yet to appear in the personal computer arena, at least for screen use, so all the original Mac's typefaces were bitmaps. Fonts were available in multiple sizes; those sizes installed on a system would be displayed in the font menu in an outline style. Some fonts would vary in appearance with size, with smaller sizes of one font having tremendous differences from the larger sizes which otherwise stayed truer to the outline version—for instance, in small sizes of Monaco lowercase L and uppercase i were bereft of the distinguishing marks present in larger sizes.

From System 1 through Mac OS 7.6, the default system fonts for Mac OS were Chicago for menus and window titles and Geneva for Finder icons, and starting in System 7 the fonts for Finder icons became customizable from the "Views" control panel. In Mac OS 8 and 9, Charcoal replaced Chicago as the default system font for menus and window titles, but it could be customized in Preferences.

=== Naming ===
After designing the first few fonts, the team decided to adopt a naming convention. First, they settled on using the names of stops along the Paoli, Pennsylvania, commuter rail line: Overbrook, Merion, Ardmore, and Rosemont. Steve Jobs had liked the idea of using cities as the names, but they had to be "world class" cities.

=== Variants ===
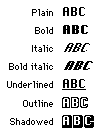

Variants of each font were algorithmically generated on-the-fly from the standard fonts. Bold, italic, outlined, underlined and shadowed variations were the most common, though some applications also included subscript and superscript.

Outline, shadow and underline are not always supported by modern software and fonts.

=== Apple logo ===
Apple's fonts and the Mac OS Roman character set include a solid Apple logo. One reason for including a trademark in a font is that the copyright status of fonts and typefaces is a complicated and uncertain matter. Trademark law, on the other hand, is much stronger. Third parties cannot include the Apple logo in fonts without permission from Apple. Apple states in the MacRoman to Unicode mapping file that:

On regular US QWERTY keyboards, the logo character can be typed using the key combination Shift Option K (⇧⌥K). In MacRoman, the Apple logo has a hex value of 0xF0. The Apple logo has not been assigned a dedicated Unicode code point, but Apple uses U+F8FF () in the Private Use Area.

Note that the logo does have a unique PostScript name in the Adobe Glyph List: /apple, mapping to F8FF.

=== List of Fonts ===
The following fonts were installed on the original version of the Macintosh sold in the United States:

- Athens (slab serif)
- Cairo was a bitmap dingbat font, most famous for the dogcow at the z character position.
- Chicago (sans-serif) was the default Macintosh system font in System 1–7.6. Also seen on LCD screens of earlier iPod models.
- Geneva (sans-serif) is designed for small point sizes and prevalent in all versions of the Mac user interface. Its name betrays its inspiration by the Swiss typeface Helvetica. Nine point Geneva is built into Old World ROM Macs.
- London (blackletter) was an Old English–style font.
- Los Angeles (script) was a thin font that emulated handwriting.
- Mobile was a bitmap dingbat font. Before System 6, it was known as Taliesin.
- Monaco (sans-serif, monospaced) is a fixed-width font well-suited for 9–12 pt use. Ten point Monaco is built into Old World ROM Macs.
- New York (serif) was a Times Roman–inspired font. The name alluded to the inspiration, even though the Times for which Times Roman was created was that of London, not New York.
- San Francisco was a whimsical font where each character looked as if it was a cutout from a newspaper, creating an intentional ransom note effect.
- Toronto (slab serif) was a geometric design. It was removed from System 6 and later.
- Venice (script) was a calligraphic font designed by Bill Atkinson.

== See also ==
- List of macOS fonts
- Typography of Apple Inc.
