= List of typefaces included with macOS =

This list of fonts contains every font shipped with Mac OS X 10.0 through macOS 10.14, including any that shipped with language-specific updates from Apple (primarily Korean and Chinese fonts). For fonts shipped only with Mac OS X 10.5, please see Apple's documentation.

Notes on subtype classification:

- Some scripts have typographical traditions with relatively simple mapping to Western sans-serif/serif/script classification. These mapped classifications are provided too. More specifically:
  - For Cyrillic and Greek, classification proceeds as in Latin.
  - For CJK, East Asian Gothic typefaces are classified as sans-serif, Ming/Song/Batang and Fangsong as serif, and handwritten styles such as Kai as "script".
- Non-Latin fonts generally contain both characters in the intended script and a small set of Latin characters. The two parts may differ in style and classification, hence the "with sans/sans-serif Latin part" indication.

== System fonts up to Mac OS X 10.7 ==
Family Name	Subtype	Styles Available	Target script and other notes
Al Bayan	non-Latin with sans Latin	Regular, Bold	Arabic
American Typewriter	slab serif, book	Condensed Light, Condensed, Condensed Bold, Light, Regular, Bold	
Andalé Mono	sans-serif, mono, book	Regular, Bold	
Apple Casual	display	Regular	Hidden, see below
Apple Chancery	script	Regular	
Apple Garamond	serif, book	Light, Light Italic, Book, Book Italic, Bold, Bold Italic	Hidden, see below
Apple Gothic		Regular	Korean
Apple LiGothic	non-Latin sans-serif	Medium	Traditional Chinese
Apple LiSung	non-Latin serif	Light	Traditional Chinese
Apple Myungjo	non-Latin serif	Regular	Korean
Apple Symbols	picture	Regular	
AquaKana		Regular	Japanese, Not depicted below
Arial	sans-serif, book	Condensed Light, Narrow, Narrow Italic, Narrow Bold, Narrow Bold Italic, Regular, Italic, Bold, Rounded Bold, Bold Italic, Black	Bundled with Microsoft Windows (except for Arial Condensed Light is not bundled with Windows.)
Arial Hebrew	non-Latin	Regular, Bold	Hebrew
Ayuthaya	non-Latin	Regular	Thai; not depicted below
Baghdad	non-Latin	Regular	Arabic
Bank Script	script	Regular	
Baskerville	serif, book	Regular, Italic, Semi-bold, Semi-bold Italic, Bold, Bold Italic	
Beijing	serif non-Latin with mono-serif Latin part	Regular	Simplified Chinese; bitmap only
BiauKai	script non-Latin with serif Latin part	Regular	Traditional Chinese; missing in Yosemite and El Capitan until Sierra.
Big Caslon	serif, book	Medium	
Browallia New	non-Latin	Regular, Italic, Bold, Bold Italic	Thai, Bundled with Microsoft Windows
BrowalliaUPC	non-Latin	Regular, Italic, Bold, Bold Italic	Thai, Bundled with Microsoft Windows
Brush Script	script	Italic	
Candara	sans-serif, book	Regular, Italic, Bold, Bold Italic	Bundled with Microsoft Windows
Chalkboard	semi-bold	Regular, Bold	Bold added in 10.4; Bold not depicted below
Chalkduster	bold	Regular	added in 10.6; not depicted below
Charcoal		Regular	Classic only
Charcoal CY	non-Latin	Regular	Cyrillic
Chicago	sans, book	Regular	Classic only, see Krungthep below
Cochin	serif, book	Regular, Italic, Bold, Bold Italic	
Comic Sans	casual	Regular, Bold	Bundled with Microsoft Windows
Consolas	sans-serif, mono	Regular, Italic, Bold, Italic	Bundled with Microsoft Windows
Cooper	extra-bold	Black	
Copperplate	serif, title, small caps	Light, Regular, Bold	
Corsiva Hebrew	non-Latin	Regular	Hebrew
Courier	slab serif mono, book	Regular, Oblique, Bold, Bold Oblique	
Courier New	slab serif mono, book	Regular, Italic, Bold, Bold Italic	Bundled with Microsoft Windows
DecoType Naskh	non-Latin	Regular	Naskh Arabic; not depicted below
Devanagari	non-Latin sans-serif	Regular, Bold	Devanagari
Didot	serif, book	Regular, Italic, Bold	
Euphemia UCAS	sans-serif, book	Regular, Italic, Bold	Canadian Syllabics; not depicted below
Futura	sans-serif, book	Condensed Medium, Condensed Extra Bold, Medium, Medium Italic	
Gadget	sans-serif, title	Regular	Classic only
Geeza Pro	non-Latin with sans-serif Latin part	Regular, Bold	Arabic
Geezah	non-Latin with sans-serif Latin part	Regular	Arabic
Geneva	sans-serif, book	Regular, Bold	
Geneva CY	non-Latin	Regular	Cyrillic
Georgia	serif, book	Regular, Italic, Bold, Bold Italic	Bundled with Microsoft Windows
Gill Sans	sans-serif, book	Light, Light Italic, Regular, Italic, Bold, Bold Italic	
Gujarati	non-Latin with sans-serif Latin part	Regular, Bold	Gujarati
Gung Seoche	non-Latin script with serif Latin part	Regular	Korean, named "#GungSeo" in font list
Gurmukhi	non-Latin with sans-serif Latin part	Regular	Gurmukhi
Hangangche	non-Latin sans-serif	Regular	Korean
HeadlineA	non-Latin	Regular	Korean, named "#HeadLineA" in font list
Hei	non-Latin sans-serif	Regular	Simplified Chinese
Helvetica	sans, book	Regular, Oblique, Bold, Bold Oblique	System Font for Small Text
Helvetica CY	non-Latin, sans, book	Regular, Oblique, Bold, Bold Oblique	Cyrillic; Face is condensed compared to Helvetica, Helvetica Neue
Helvetica Neue	sans, book	Condensed Bold, Condensed Black, Ultra-light, Ultra-light Italic, Light, Light Italic, Regular, Italic, Bold, Bold Italic	
Herculanum	display, deco, upper case	Regular	
Hiragino Kaku Gothic Pro	non-Latin sans-serif	W3, W6	Japanese
Hiragino Kaku Gothic ProN	non-Latin sans-serif	W3, W6	Japanese based on JIS X 0213
Hiragino Kaku Gothic Std	non-Latin sans-serif	W8	Japanese
Hiragino Kaku Gothic StdN	non-Latin sans-serif	W8	Japanese based on JIS X 0213
Hiragino Maru Gothic Pro	non-Latin sans-serif	W4	Japanese
Hiragino Maru Gothic ProN	non-Latin sans-serif	W4	Japanese based on JIS X 0213
Hiragino Mincho Pro	non-Latin sans-serif	W3, W6	Japanese
Hiragino Mincho ProN	non-Latin sans-serif	W3, W6	Japanese based on JIS X 0213
Hoefler Text	serif, book	Regular, Italic, Black, Black Italic, Ornaments	Re‐added in 10.3, but present in System 7.5 also
Inai Mathi	non-Latin	Regular	Tamil; added in 10.4; not depicted below
Impact	sans-serif, "fantasy", title	Regular	Bundled with Compacting Fonts
Jung Gothic	non-Latin sans-serif	Medium	Korean
Kai	non-Latin script with serif Latin part	Regular	Simplified Chinese
Keyboard		Regular	
Krungthep	non-Latin	Regular	Thai; Latin characters identical to Chicago; not depicted below
KufiStandard GK	non-Latin	Regular	Arabic; not depicted below
Kuenstler Script	script	Regular, Black	
Last Resort		Regular	Keyboard
LiHei Pro	non-Latin sans-serif	Medium	Traditional Chinese
LiSong Pro	non-Latin serif	Light	Traditional Chinese
Lucida Sans	sans, book	Regular, Bold, Italic, Bold Italic	Included from MacOS
Marker Felt	casual script	Thin, Wide	
Menlo	sans-serif, mono	Regular, Bold, Italic, Bold Italic	
Monaco	sans-serif, mono	Regular	
Monaco CY	non-Latin sans-serif mono	Regular	Cyrillic
Mshtakan	non-Latin	Regular, Oblique, Bold, Bold Oblique	Armenian; added in 10.3; not depicted below
Nadeem	non-Latin	Regular	Arabic
New Peninim	sans-serif, book	Regular, Inclined, Bold, Bold Inclined	Hebrew
New York	serif, book	Regular, Bold, Italic, Bold Italic	Classic only
NISC GB18030	non-Latin mono	Regular	Chinese; bitmap only; not depicted below; named "GB18030 Bitmap" in font lists
Optima	sans-serif, book	Regular, Italic, Bold, Bold Italic, Extra Black	
Osaka	non-Latin sans-serif, proportional and mono	Regular, Monospace	Japanese
Palatino	serif, book	Regular, Italic, Bold, Bold Italic	Classic or iLife
Papyrus	casual, normal	Regular, Condensed	Bundled with Microsoft Windows
PC Myungjo	non-Latin	Regular	Korean, named "#PCMyungjo" in font list
Pilgiche	non-Latin	Regular	Korean, named "#PilGi" in font list
Plantagenet Cherokee	serif, book	Regular	Cherokee
Raanana	non-Latin	Regular, Bold	Hebrew
Sand	bold italic	Regular	Classic only
Sathu	non-Latin	Regular	Thai; not depicted below
Seoul	non-Latin	Regular	Korean
Shin Myungjo Neue	non-Latin	Regular	Korean
Silom	non-Latin	Regular	Thai; not depicted below
Skia	sans-serif, book	Light, Light Condensed, Light Extended, Regular, Condensed, Extended, Bold, Black, Black Condensed, Black Extended	
Snell Roundhand	script	Regular	
ST FangSong	non-Latin serif (FangSong)	Regular	Simplified Chinese
ST FangSong 2	non-Latin serif (FangSong)	Regular	Simplified Chinese
ST Heiti	non-Latin sans-serif	Light, Regular	Simplified Chinese
ST Kaiti	non-Latin script with Latin serif	Regular	Simplified Chinese
ST Song	non-Latin serif	Regular	Simplified Chinese
Symbol	symbol	Regular	Bundled with Microsoft Windows
Tae Graphic	non-Latin sans-serif	Regular	Korean
Tahoma	sans, book	Light, Regular, Bold	Bundled with Microsoft Windows
Taipei	non-Latin	Regular	Traditional Chinese; bitmap only; not depicted below
Techno	sans, title	Regular	Classic only
Textile	bold italic	Regular	Classic (and iDVD)
Thonburi	non-Latin	Regular	Thai; Latin characters identical to Geneva; not depicted below
Times	serif, book	Regular, Italic, Bold, Bold Italic	
Times CY	non-Latin, serif	Regular, Italic, Bold, Bold Italic	Cyrillic; removed from 10.4
Times New Roman	serif, book	Regular, Italic, Bold, Bold Italic	Bundled with Microsoft Windows
Trebuchet MS	sans, book	Regular, Italic, Bold, Bold Italic	Bundled with Microsoft Windows
Verdana	sans, book	Regular, Italic, Bold, Bold Italic	Bundled with Microsoft Windows
Zapf Chancery	script	Medium Italic	Classic only
Zapf Dingbats	picture	Regular	
Zapfino	script, deco	Regular	

== New fonts added with OS X 10.10 Yosemite ==
The following system fonts have been added with Yosemite:

- Bodoni 72: Book, Italic, Bold (these three in separate fonts with lining and text figures), Small Caps, Ornaments (Sumner Stone)
- ITF Devanagari
- Kohinoor Devanagari (Satya Rajpurohit)
- Luminari (Philip Bouwsma)
- Phosphate: Inline and Solid (Steve Jackaman & Ashley Muir)
- Shree Devanagari 714 (Modular Infotech)
- SignPainter (House Industries)
- Skia: Light, Light Condensed, Light Extended, Condensed, Extended, Bold, Black, Black Condensed, Black Extended (Matthew Carter; system previously only included regular)
- Sukhumvit Set: Thin, Light, Text, Medium, SemiBold, Bold (Anuthin Wongsunkakon; previously used as a system font for iOS 7.0)
- Bitstream Symbols
- Trattatello (James Grieshaber)

== New fonts added with OS X 10.11 El Capitan ==
At least the following system fonts have been added with El Capitan:

- PingFang SC / PingFang TC / PingFang HK, a new set of Chinese UI Fonts produced by DynaComware in lieu of deprecated STHeiti Family. Gothic (sans-serif).
- San Francisco UI / Display / Text.

== New fonts added with macOS 10.12 Sierra ==
At least the following system fonts have been added with Sierra:

- Toppan Bunkyu Mincho Pr6N Regular
- Toppan Bunkyu Midashi Mincho StdN ExtraBold
- Toppan Bunkyu Gothic Pr6N Regular / Demibold
- Toppan Bunkyu Midashi Gothic StdN Extrabold
- Monotype LingWai Medium (SC / TC)
- Songti (SC / TC) - Chinese Serif
- Yu Kyokasho N (Medium / Bold) (Vertical Version / Horizontal Version)
- San Francisco Mono

== New fonts added with macOS 10.13 High Sierra ==
High Sierra added several system fonts or additional weights of existing system fonts:

- Charter (Roman, Italic, Bold, Bold Italic, Black, Black Italic)
- DIN (Alternate Bold, Condensed Bold)
- Hiragino Kaku Gothic StdN W8
- InaiMathi (Bold)
- Kai (Regular)
- Kaiti SC (Regular, Bold, Black)
- Myriad Arabic (Semibold)
- Noto Nastaliq Urdu
- Rockwell (Regular, Italic, Bold, Bold Italic)
- STIX Two Math
- STIX Two Text (Regular, Italic, Bold, Bold Italic)
- Sukothai (Regular, Bold)

== Font appearances ==
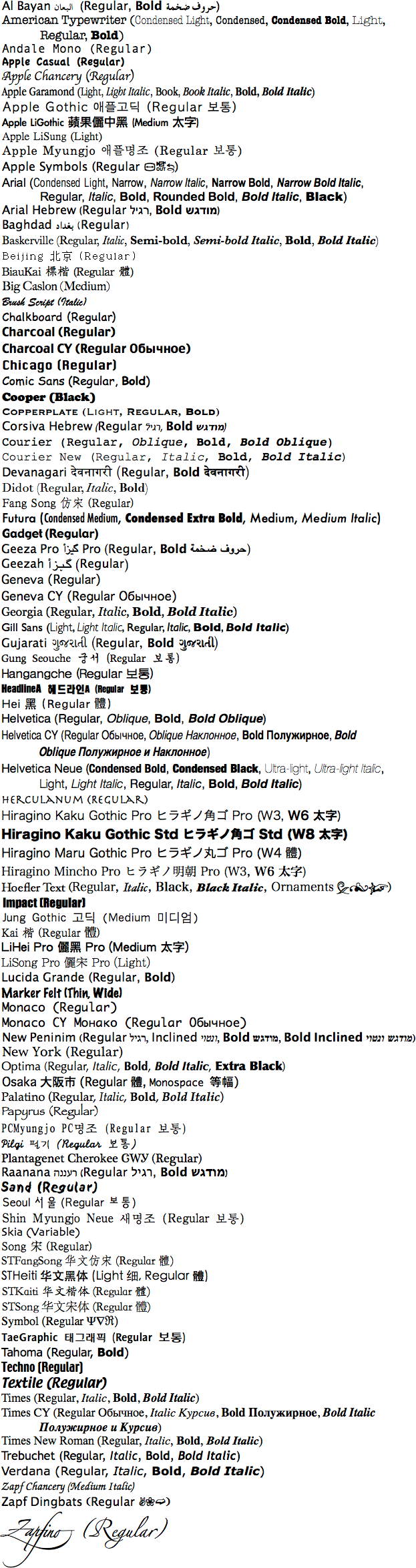

- These images compare Roman fonts only, in most styles:

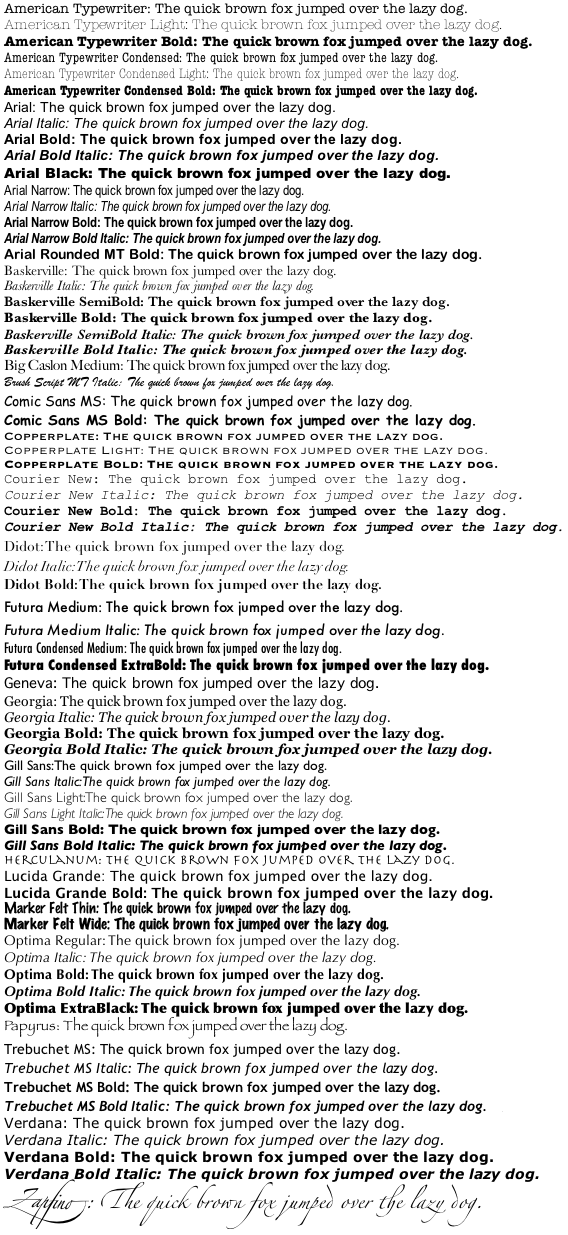

- The fonts in the following list were included as "extras" with AppleWorks 6, which was bundled with new iMacs until 2006.

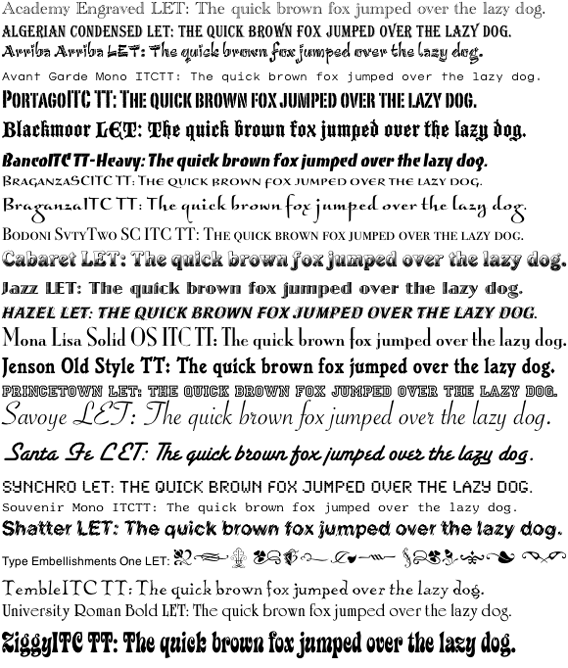

== Hidden fonts ==
A large number of fonts have also been provided with iMovie, iLife, iDVD and other Apple applications in hidden folders, for the sole use of these applications. The reason why these fonts are hidden is unknown, with licensing issues suggested as the cause. However, one may easily install them for use by all applications by copying them out of their Library directories and installing them as with any third-party font, although one should always check that the license for the fonts allows them to be used outside the given software.

Examples of notable hidden fonts on macOS are Bank Gothic, Bodoni, Century Gothic, Century Schoolbook, Garamond, several cuts of Lucida, Superclarendon and Monotype Twentieth Century.

== See also ==
- List of typefaces
- Unicode typefaces
- List of typefaces included with Microsoft Windows
- Fonts on the Mac
