= Typography of Apple Inc. =

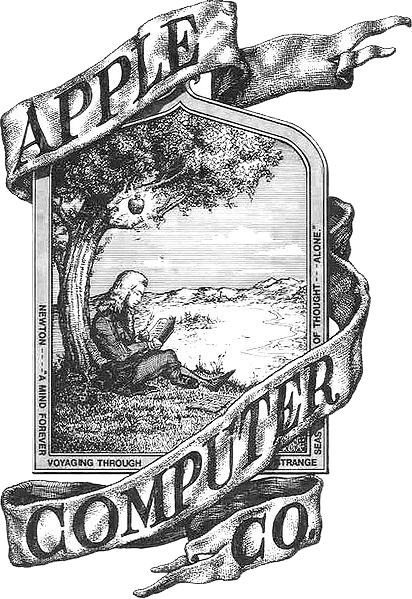
Apple's first logo, hand drawn by Ronald Wayne

Apple Inc. uses a large variety of typefaces in its marketing, operating systems, and industrial design with each product cycle. These change throughout the years with Apple's change of style in their products. This is evident in the design and marketing of the company. The current logo is an apple with a bite out of it, which was first utilized in 1999.

== Marketing ==
For at least 18 years, Apple's corporate typeface was a custom variant of the ITC Garamond typeface called Apple Garamond. It was used alongside the Apple logo for product names on computers, in many ads and printed materials, and on the company's website. Starting in 2002, Apple gradually shifted towards using Myriad as its corporate font. Starting with the Apple Watch in 2015, Apple began using San Francisco as its corporate font.

=== Hand-drawn logo ===
Prior to adopting the bitten Apple as its logo, Apple used a complex logo featuring Isaac Newton sitting below an apple tree. The words APPLE COMPUTER CO. were drawn on a ribbon banner ornamenting the picture frame. The frame itself held a quotation from Wordsworth: "Newton....A Mind Forever Voyaging Through Strange Seas of Thought...Alone.", taken from Wordsworth's autobiographical poem The Prelude. The logo was hand drawn and thus did not use an established font. However, the type is similar to Caslon.

=== Motter Tektura ===
The Apple logo alongside the Motter Tektura typeface

Before the introduction of the first Macintosh, Apple used a typeface called Motter Tektura for their company logo and product labels, which was originally designed in Austria by Othmar Motter of Vorarlberger Graphik in 1975 and distributed by Letraset (and also famously used by Reebok). At the time, the typeface was considered new and modern. The exact font used by Apple is slightly modified from the standard Motter Tektura: the s is more conventionally shaped, as opposed to the descending "hook" design of the normal typeface, and (with the exception of the Disk II 5.25 drive) the dot over the i is removed.

According to the logo designer, Rob Janoff, the typeface was selected for its playful qualities and techno look, which were in line with Apple's mission statement of making high technology accessible to anyone. Janoff designed the logo in 1977 while working with Palo Alto marketer Regis McKenna. The Apple logo's bite mark was originally designed to fit snugly with the Motter Tektura a (as in the adjacent red banner).

In the early 1980s, the company logo was simplified by removing "computer ınc.". Motter Tektura is most notably used for the Apple II logo. The typeface has sometimes been mislabeled as Cupertino, a similar bitmap font likely created to mimic Motter Tektura.

=== Apple Garamond ===
Apple Garamond was used in most of Apple's marketing.

Starting with the introduction of the first Macintosh in 1984, Apple adopted a new corporate font called Apple Garamond. It was a variation of the classic Garamond typeface, both narrower and having a taller x-height. Specifically, ITC Garamond (created by Tony Stan in 1977) was condensed to 80% of its normal width. Bitstream condensed the font, subtly adjusted the stroke widths, and performed the hinting required to create the font, which was delivered to Apple as the Postscript font "apgaram".

In cases where the Apple logo was accompanied by text, it was always set in Apple Garamond. Aside from the company name, most of Apple's advertising and marketing slogans, such as "Think different", used the font as well.

The typeface was virtually synonymous with Apple for almost two decades and formed a large part of the company's brand recognition. It was used not only in conjunction with the logo, but also in manuals and ads and to label products with model names.

Apple has not released the true Apple Garamond font. ITC briefly sold ITC Garamond Narrow—Apple Garamond without the custom hinting—as part of its Apple Font Pack in the 1990s. A version of the font was also included under a different name in some versions of Mac OS X prior to 10.3 as it was used by the Setup Assistant installation program.

=== Gill Sans ===
In the marketing of the Apple Newton line of personal digital assistant devices starting in 1992, Apple used Gill Sans. Gill Sans Regular was used in the logo, for the model name on the devices, on the keyboard and in advertising materials, though it was not used as the screen font on the devices.

=== Myriad ===
Adobe's Myriad was used in Apple's marketing 2002–2017.

In 2002, Apple gradually started using a variant of Adobe's Myriad font family in its marketing and packaging. As new revisions of its products were released, the text changed from the serif Apple Garamond to the sans-serif Myriad Apple. The family's bolds were used for headlines, and other weights accordingly.

The Myriad font family was designed by Robert Slimbach and Carol Twombly for Adobe in the early 1990s. Myriad Apple, a modification produced by Galápagos Design Group, incorporates minor spacing and weight differences from the standard varieties, and includes Apple-specific characters, such as the company logo. In 2006, Myriad Apple was superseded by Myriad Set, which contains extra ligatures and other minor changes.

Around 2012, lighter fonts became prevalent in Apple's marketing, with headlines in Myriad Pro Light. Occasionally, an even lighter variant of Myriad was used for specialized marketing materials and press releases.

=== San Francisco ===
The San Francisco font

In 2015, with the release of the Apple Watch, Apple began the usage of San Francisco in Apple Watch marketing materials, as well as in the Apple Music wordmark. In September 2016, the company began using it as the typeface of wordmarks such as "iPhone", "AirPods", and "MacBook Pro", on the devices themselves, as well as keynote slides and product packaging. This change was also reflected in some headlines on product marketing web pages. Subsequently, on January 24, 2017, Apple began updating its website to use the San Francisco font, and as a result it became the company's universal typeface for all its products.

== System fonts ==
Apple has used a variety of system fonts for the user interfaces of its products.

=== Early fonts ===
Apple's earliest computers, along with other personal computers of the period, had extremely limited graphical capabilities and could originally display only uppercase ASCII using a set bitmap font. The IIc and Enhanced Apple IIe expanded on this, supporting 40 or 80 columns of text and an extended character set called MouseText. It was used to simulate simple graphical user interfaces, similar to the use of ANSI X3.64.

The first Apple computer with a purely bitmapped display, the Lisa, shipped in 1983. It used a system font with distinctive V and W letterforms.

=== Chicago and Charcoal ===
Chicago

Charcoal

When the Macintosh was introduced in 1984, it used a bitmap font designed by Susan Kare called Chicago. In Mac OS 8, introduced in 1997, the system font of Mac OS was changed to Charcoal. Charcoal was designed by David Berlow of Font Bureau, to be easier to read than Chicago, while retaining similar metrics for backward compatibility with existing application software.

When released in 2001, Apple's iPod music player reused the Macintosh font Chicago as the system font. Later versions of the iPod drew from the larger character repertoire of the TrueType Chicago, adding a number of characters not present in the bitmap Chicago, such as Greek and Cyrillic. Even though the screen supported grayscale, the characters were not anti-aliased.

=== Geneva ===
For smaller user interface elements, such as the names of files displayed with icons in the Finder, Apple used the Geneva typeface, a redesigned version of Helvetica.

=== Shaston ===
Introduced in 1986, the Apple IIGS, had very tall pixels in the 640 × 200 pixels mode usually used for productivity applications, with an aspect ratio of 5:12 in a 4:3 image (alternately, 5:6 with 320 × 200 pixels), thus requiring a stout, 8-point bitmap font called Shaston 8 as the system font (for menus, window titles, etc.). Shaston was described in Apple IIGS technote #41 as "a modified Helvetica", but the similarities are not striking. The fonts of the original Macintosh were also available for the GS.

=== Espy Sans ===
In 1991, Apple's Human Interface Group contracted with LetterPerfect Fonts' Garrett Boge and Damon Clark, to design a family of bitmap screen fonts to replace Chicago and Geneva, although Chicago was eventually replaced with Charcoal instead. The family consisted of Sans & Serif, Regular and Bold in discrete bitmap sizes of 8, 9, 10, 12 & 14 pt. The Sans, proving most useful for screen readability, was also used for the Newton OS GUI. The Newton used the font Apple Casual to display text entered using the Rosetta handwriting recognition engine in the Newton. The same font found its way into the Rosetta-derived writing recognition system in Mac OS X—Inkwell. The TrueType font can be made available to any application by copying the font file, which is embedded in a system component, to any font folder. (See List of macOS fonts for more information.) The Newton logo featured the Gill Sans typeface, which was also used for the Newton keyboard.

Espy Sans was later used as the font for Apple's eWorld online service in 1994. (eWorld also used the larger bold condensed bitmap font eWorld Tight for headlines. The metrics of eWorld Tight were based on Helvetica Ultra Compressed.) The iPod mini, released in 2004, also used Espy Sans.

=== Lucida Grande ===
Since its introduction in 2000 up through OS X Mavericks, Lucida Grande was the system font used in Mac OS X user interface elements, such as menus, dialog boxes, and other widgets. It was superseded by Helvetica Neue.

=== Podium Sans ===
Starting in 2004, the iPod photo, 5th-generation iPod, and 1st- through 2nd-generation iPod nano feature a bitmap font known as Podium Sans, displacing the use of Chicago as the iPod system font. Although originally promoted as Myriad, Podium Sans is missing Myriad's trademark features, such as the splayed "M" and distinctive "y".

=== Helvetica ===
Since the introduction of the 1st-generation iPhone in 2007, Apple has used Helvetica in its software design. iOS for the iPhone, iPod touch, iPad, and Apple TV employs the font, alongside its use on iPods beginning with the 6th-generation iPod classic and 3rd-generation iPod nano.

In conjunction with the iPhone 4 in 2010, Apple began using Helvetica Neue on devices with Retina display, while keeping use of Helvetica on non-Retina devices.

Around 2012, Apple started using Helvetica in macOS (then named OS X) application software. iTunes, iMovie, iPhoto, GarageBand, and Apple's professional applications started to feature heavy use of Helvetica, while the majority of the OS X (now named macOS) environment retained the comparatively more legible Lucida Grande typeface, which was designed specifically for on-screen use.

After the introduction of iOS 7 in June 2013, Apple began using an extra-thin weight of Helvetica Neue for the user interface of iOS 7, arousing numerous complaints about the less legible typography. For the final release of the operating system, Apple changed the system's font to a slightly thicker weight of Helvetica Neue, although some have complained that readability is still compromised compared to the font weight used in former versions of iOS. Older iOS devices continue to use Helvetica or Helvetica Neue in regular font weights that display with higher contrast on low-resolution displays.

With the introduction of OS X 10.10 "Yosemite" in June 2014, Apple started using Helvetica Neue as the system font on the Mac. This brought all of Apple's user interfaces in line, using Helvetica Neue throughout.

=== San Francisco ===
San Francisco is currently used for user interface across all of Apple's product line, including watchOS, macOS, iOS, iPadOS, tvOS and visionOS. The three main variants are SF Pro for macOS, iOS, iPadOS, tvOS and visionOS; SF Compact for watchOS; and SF Mono for the Terminal, Console, and Xcode applications. It was first introduced alongside the Apple Watch, where it was used for enhanced legibility and taller x-heights for easy reading on a small display. The design references a number of different other typefaces, notably FF DIN (used in the UI of the Camera app in iOS 7 and iOS 8), Helvetica (used in the UI in iOS 6 and below), Helvetica Neue (used in the UI of iOS 7 and iOS 8 as well as OS X Yosemite, with some devices even with iOS 4 through iOS 6), Roboto (Google's new UI typeface), and Univers (used on Apple's early keyboard designs).

It was widely speculated that San Francisco was going to be the long-awaited font that Apple had reportedly been developing for independent use in their products, and the font's name was leaked in November 2014 when the WatchKit SDK was released to developers. On June 8, 2015, at the WWDC 2015 conference, San Francisco replaced Helvetica Neue as the system font for both macOS and iOS operating systems. The version used, known as "SF UI", was modified to make it wider than its Apple Watch counterpart, more akin to the previously used Helvetica Neue. The original version has since been renamed "SF Compact".

=== New York ===
In 2019, Apple released New York, a serif counterpart to San Francisco.

== Keyboards ==
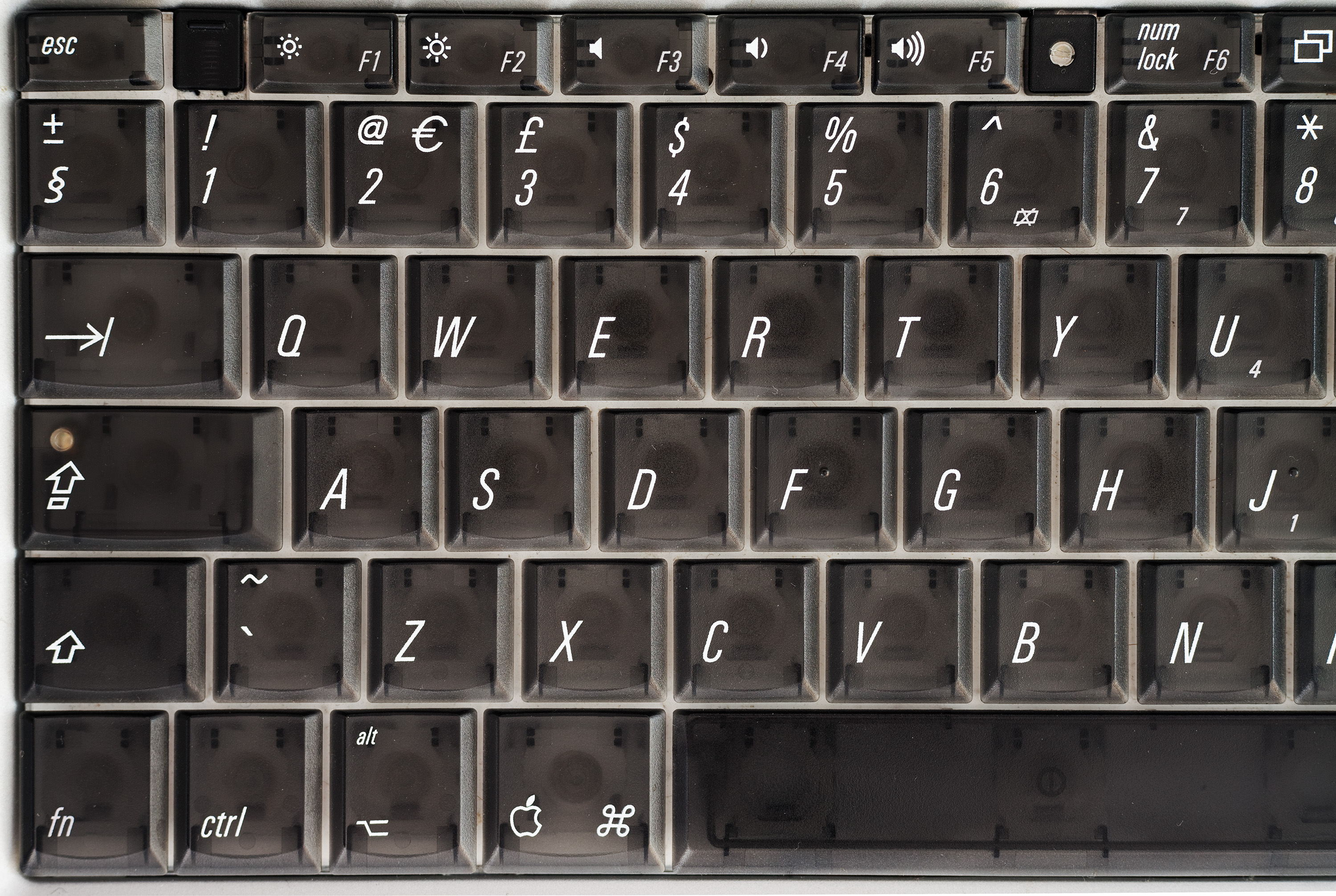
Univers on a UK Titanium PowerBook G4

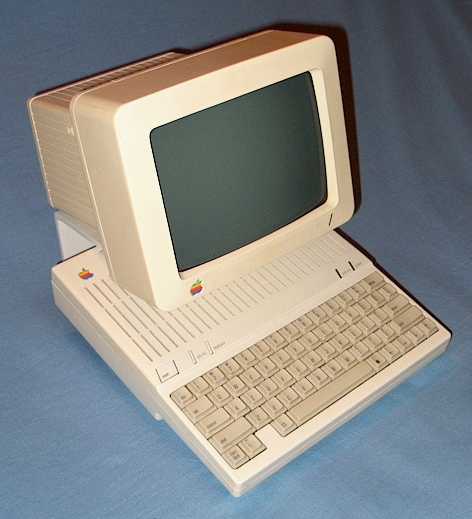
Univers was first used as the keyboard font of the Apple IIc.

Apple's keyboards were long labeled with Univers 48 (Condensed Light Oblique), a design choice by Apple's industrial design partner, Frog Design. This began in 1984 with the Apple IIc, which had tilted front-panel buttons to match the inclination of the lettering.

Univers was eventually replaced on Apple's keyboards by VAG Rounded, which was used on all iBook models, PowerBooks introduced after 2003, and MacBooks, MacBook Pros, MacBook Airs, and Apple Keyboards from August 2007 until early 2015. The font was developed by Sedley Place Ltd. for German car manufacturer Volkswagen and was used in much of their marketing materials.

On March 9, 2015, Apple introduced a new generation of MacBook that utilizes the Apple designed San Francisco typeface.

== See also ==
- Fonts on Macintosh
- List of Apple typefaces
- List of typefaces included with macOS
