= Alexandria (typeface) =

- Category: Serif
- Classification: Slab serif
- Designer: Hank Gillette

Alexandria is a slab serif typeface created by Hank Gillete. It corresponds to the neo-grotesque sub-classification.

It is patterned after Susan Kare's bitmap Athens for the original Macintosh, which never got an official TrueType version. Athene, by Rebecca Bettencourt, is a similar design.
