= Espy Sans =

Typeface designed in 1992 for Apple Computer

- Category: Sans-serif
- Designers: Garret Boge & Damon Clark (1992)
- Foundry: Apple Computer, LetterPerfect Fonts (1992)

Espy Sans was the final bitmap-only font created by Apple Inc. It was designed by Garrett Boge and Damon Clark of LetterPerfect Fonts for the Apple Computer user interface group in 1992. The Espy family consists of Sans & Serif typefaces, each with Regular & Bold styles in discrete bitmap sizes of 8, 9, 10, 12 & 14 pt. Espy Sans bears similarities to Frutiger and Myriad.

Espy Sans was used for the Newton PDA project and their eWorld online bulletin board service. It was later adapted for use in the Apple Guide help system and some versions of the iPod, particularly the iPod mini. Before the release of the Charcoal font used for Mac OS 8 and 9, Espy Sans was a popular replacement system font for reskinnings of Mac OS 7.x, being included in system extensions such as Greg Landweber's Aaron extension.

== See also ==
- Apple typography
