= Llygod Ffyrnig =

Welsh language 1970s punk band

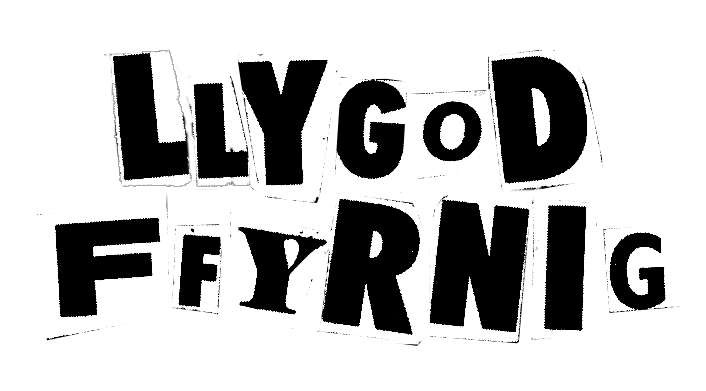

Background information
- Years active: 1977-1980
- Label: Pwdwr
- Past members: Dafydd Rhys; Gary Beard; Hywel Peckham; Julian Lewis; Pete Williams; Wayne Gwilym; Huw Davies; Richard Zammit

Llygod Ffyrnig were a Welsh punk band from the Llanelli area. It is likely that Llygod Ffyrnig were the first punk group to sing in Welsh. The original members were: Dafydd Rhys – Vocals, Hywel Peckham – Guitar, Gary Beard – Guitar, Julian Lewis – Drums, Pete Williams – Bass.

== Works ==
The single NCB was released on the Pwdwr label in 1978. It is now a rare collectable. It was played on the John Peel program on BBC Radio 1 and was chosen as single of the week by Melody Maker magazine.

The 7"'s title track NCB had lyrics which were written by Gary Melville who is also named as the manager on the back cover of the record. The music was written by Gary Beard. The song describes the poor options for young men in the south Wales valleys at the time - between unemployment or the dangerous and hard jobs working in a coal mine for the NCB (National Coal Board). The chorus Byw ar y dôl, rhyddid ffôl, dim ond silicosis sydd ar ôl translates to Living on the meadow, foolish freedom, only silicosis remains, referring to the disease silicosis caused by coal mine dust.

500 copies of the single were originally pressed with white labels in 1978 and then a second edition in 1979 with fuller printer labels. The black and white cover shows a photo-montage of a miner. Similarly the band's name on the cover is also in letters cut out of newspaper to create a ransom note effect similar to the Sex Pistols and other punk bands of the era.

NCB was included on the multi-part compilation LP Labels Unlimited - The Second Record Collection - a collection of records from punk and new wave labels on the Cherry Red label in 1979.

== Members ==
In 1979 Dafydd Rhys, Gary Beard and Julian Lewis left and Wayne Gwilym came in as singer, Huw Davies in on guitar and Richard Zammit on drums. Dafydd Rhys rejoined later in 1979. The band broke up in 1980.
