= Chicago (typeface) =

Sans-serif typeface

- Category: Sans-serif
- Designer: Susan Kare
- Foundry: Apple Computer
- Date released: 1984
- Re-issuing foundries: Bigelow & Holmes

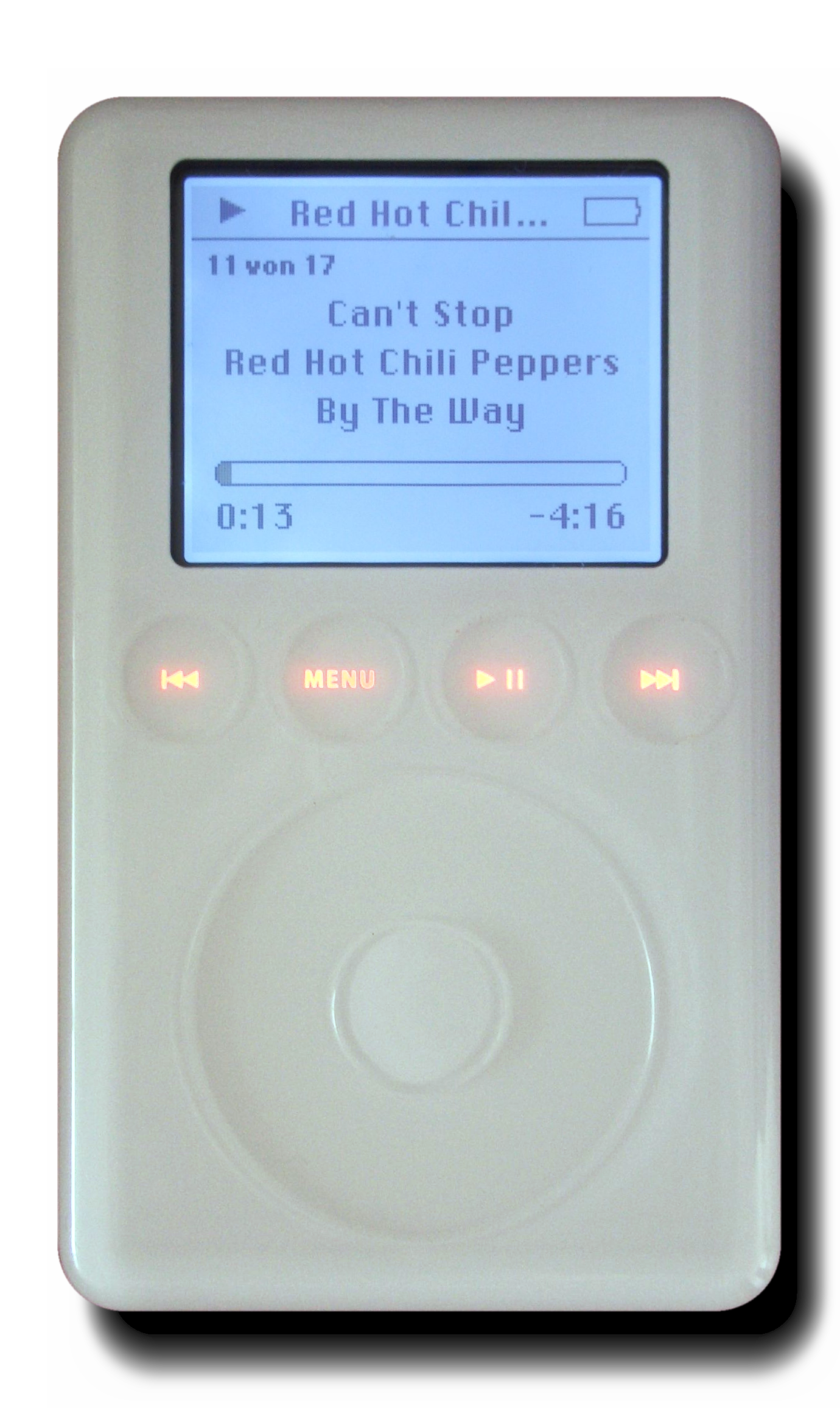
A third-generation iPod, using an altered Chicago typeface in its user interface

Chicago is a sans-serif typeface designed by Susan Kare for Apple Computer. It was used in the user interface of the Mac OS between 1984 and 1997, and was an important part of Apple's brand identity. It was also used in early versions of the iPod user interface. Chicago was initially a bitmap font; as Mac OS's capabilities improved, Apple commissioned the type foundry Bigelow & Holmes to create a vector-based TrueType version in 1991. The typeface is named after the U.S. city of Chicago, following the theme of original Macintosh fonts being named after major world cities.

== Description ==
Susan Kare said that Chicago was the first font to be developed for the Macintosh. Before the team settled on the convention of naming fonts after world cities, it was called Elefont (also the name of a bold semi-serif typeface designed by Bob McGrath in 1978). Early Macintosh computers had one-bit, black and white displays with no gray, and unavailable menu items and other controls were dimmed in gray (rendered as a checkerboard pattern of pixels), requiring a font that would be clearly legible at this effectively lower resolution. Chicago was designed solely for this purpose, hence its unusual appearance. It was one size, 12 pt., for menus, dialogs, window titles, and text labels, and was the system font for this purpose in all versions of Mac OS that supported the early compact Macs and their one-bit displays until System 7.6. Printed documentation often included screen images, in which the bitmap Chicago 12 was plainly pixelated. A TrueType version was created in 1991 for this documentation purpose, exactly fitting the sizing and spacing of the single-size bitmap version and allowing printed documentation to illustrate computer screens without the font appearing jagged and out of place on a printed page. This outline version had many differences from the bitmap version, more apparent at greater sizes, for which it was not intended. The zero was also slashed to distinguish it from the capital "O".

In Mac OS 8, which only supported systems with grayscale and color displays, Charcoal replaced Chicago as the default system font. Chicago continued to be distributed as a standard component of the system, and Apple urged developers to keep designing user interfaces for the Chicago typeface, since the new alternate fonts used the Chicago metrics as a foundation.

German-language versions of Mac OS, as well as all versions of Mac OS 9, had a different rendering of the 12-point version of Chicago. The letter "W" had two dips instead of one at the bottom, the letter "V" had its lower tip at the center instead of veering left, and the letter "I" (capital "i") had serifs at the top and bottom, distinguishing it from "l" (lowercase "L"). A mix of this and the original Chicago was used in the original iPod.

Chicago was also used in Apple marketing materials. It was common to find this font in early amateur desktop publishing productions, since it was available as part of the system. While Apple gravitated away from Chicago following the adoption of the easier-to-read Charcoal as part of the Platinum theme in Mac OS, it was later revived in the user interface of the iPod music player, where its design purpose was once again applicable. With the introduction of the iPod mini, however, a smaller typeface was needed, and the Espy Sans font from the Apple Newton was used. Finally, with the introduction of the iPod Photo, the color iPod interface switched to Podium Sans, a bitmap font similar to the Myriad Pro typeface (which Apple had adopted gradually for its marketing beginning in 2002 before it was replaced by San Francisco in 2016).

The Chicago bitmap typeface was also adapted by Squaresoft for use in the English-language releases of Super NES games such as Final Fantasy VI and Chrono Trigger.

Though the original font is no longer bundled with macOS, two Thai-language fonts bundled with macOS, Krungthep and Silom, use Chicago for their Latin letters and hence can be used as modern replacements.

Chicago is a registered trademark ("typeface fonts recorded on computer software") belonging to Apple since August 1996 (U.S. Trademark 74,556,614).

== See also ==
- Apple typography
- Fixedsys
