= Podium Sans =

Humanist sans-serif typeface

Podium Sans is a bitmap typeface developed by Apple Inc. for the iPod photo, and subsequently used on all iPod models with a color display until the iPod lineup refresh on September 5, 2007.

At the time, Apple used Myriad as its corporate font, leading to the incorrect assumption that the iPod was also using Myriad. However, the font lacks Myriad's trademark features: its 'k' and 'K', its splayed 'M', and distinctive 'y'. Some of these changes, such as the straightening of the 'M', could be explained by Apple's designers simplifying the design to accommodate the small size and low resolution of the device compared to print.

Adding to confusion, at the launch of the iPod photo, Apple's marketing website incorrectly claimed that the device featured a "new Myriad typeface," stating:

Now in living color, it's easier to read than ever. That’s thanks in part to the clarity of the display – it offers 220x176-pixel resolution – and in part to the new Myriad typeface.

— Apple Inc., iPod photo marketing page, October 2004

The font name was revealed to be Podium Sans through the third-party customization software iPodWizard.

To align with the iPhone and iPod touch, the iPod classic and iPod nano refresh on September 5, 2007 switches the user interface font to Helvetica Bold.

== See also ==
- Typography of Apple Inc.
- List of Apple typefaces
