= Athens (typeface) =

Apple Macintosh typeface

Athens was one of the original bitmap typefaces for the Apple Macintosh computer. Susan Kare designed it. An official TrueType version was never made, and Athens was rendered obsolete with the arrival of System 7.

Alexandria by Hank Gillette and Athene by Rebecca Bettencourt are free TrueType fonts of similar design sometimes used as a surrogate on non-Apple systems.
