= Yijing Hexagram Symbols =

- Range: U+4DC0..U+4DFF (64 code points)
- Plane: BMP
- Scripts: Common
- Assigned: 64 code points
- Unused: 0 reserved code points

Unicode version history
- 4.0 (2003): 64 (+64)

Unicode documentation
- Code chart ∣ Web page
- Note: Range used for Hangul syllables prior to Unicode 2.0 (see Hangul Supplementary-B).

Yijing Hexagram Symbols is a Unicode block containing the 64 hexagrams from the I Ching.

Yijing Hexagram Symbols^{[1]} Official Unicode Consortium code chart (PDF)
	0	1	2	3	4	5	6	7	8	9	A	B	C	D	E	F
U+4DCx	䷀	䷁	䷂	䷃	䷄	䷅	䷆	䷇	䷈	䷉	䷊	䷋	䷌	䷍	䷎	䷏
U+4DDx	䷐	䷑	䷒	䷓	䷔	䷕	䷖	䷗	䷘	䷙	䷚	䷛	䷜	䷝	䷞	䷟
U+4DEx	䷠	䷡	䷢	䷣	䷤	䷥	䷦	䷧	䷨	䷩	䷪	䷫	䷬	䷭	䷮	䷯
U+4DFx	䷰	䷱	䷲	䷳	䷴	䷵	䷶	䷷	䷸	䷹	䷺	䷻	䷼	䷽	䷾	䷿
Notes: 1. As of Unicode version 16.0

== History ==
The following Unicode-related documents record the purpose and process of defining specific characters in the Yijing Hexagram Symbols block:

Version	Final code points (Note: Proposed code points and characters names may differ from final code points and names)	Count	L2 ID	WG2 ID	Document
4.0	U+4DC0..4DFF	64	L2/01-283	N2363	Cook, Richard; Everson, Michael; Jenkins, John H. (2001-07-25), Proposal to add monogram, digram and hexagram characters to the UCS
4.0	U+4DC0..4DFF	64	L2/01-295R		Moore, Lisa (2001-11-06), "Motion 88-M4", Minutes from the UTC/L2 meeting #88
4.0	U+4DC0..4DFF	64	L2/02-154	N2403	Umamaheswaran, V. S. (2002-04-22), "7.3", Draft minutes of WG 2 meeting 41, Hotel Phoenix, Singapore, 2001-10-15/19

== See also ==
- Miscellaneous Symbols Unicode block, encoding the trigrams that compose the hexagrams
