= Apple Symbols =

MacOS typeface

Apple Symbols is a font introduced in Mac OS X 10.3 “Panther”. This is a TrueType font intended to provide coverage for characters defined as symbols in the Unicode Standard. It continues to ship with Mac OS X as part of the default installation. Prior to Mac OS X 10.5, its path was /Library/Fonts/Apple Symbols.ttf. From Mac OS X 10.5 onward, it is to be found at /System/Library/Fonts/Apple Symbols.ttf, meaning it is now considered an essential part of the system software, not to be deleted by users.

The version of the font as of Mac OS X 10.5 is 6.0d7e4.

It remains available in modern macOS versions such as macOS Ventura.

== List of glyphs ==
The Mac OS X version of the font contains over 5,000 glyphs from the following Unicode blocks:

- U+0000 – U+007F — Basic Latin
- U+0080 – U+00FF — Latin-1 Supplement
- U+0180 – U+024F — Latin Extended-B
- U+02B0 – U+02FF — Spacing Modifier Letters
- U+0300 – U+036F — Combining Diacritical Marks
- U+0370 – U+03FF — Greek and Coptic
- U+1F00 – U+1FFF — Greek Extended
- U+2000 – U+206F — General Punctuation
- U+2070 – U+209F — Superscripts and Subscripts
- U+20A0 – U+20CF — Currency Symbols
- U+2100 – U+214F — Letterlike Symbols
- U+2150 – U+218F — Number Forms
- U+2190 – U+21FF — Arrows
- U+2200 – U+22FF — Mathematical Operators
- U+2300 – U+23FF — Miscellaneous Technical
- U+2400 – U+243F — Control Pictures
- U+2440 – U+245F — Optical Character Recognition
- U+2500 – U+257F — Box Drawing
- U+2580 – U+259F — Block Elements
- U+25A0 – U+25FF — Geometric Shapes
- U+2600 – U+26FF — Miscellaneous Symbols
- U+27C0 – U+27EF — Miscellaneous Mathematical Symbols-A
- U+27F0 – U+27FF — Supplemental Arrows-A
- U+2800 – U+28FF — Braille Patterns
- U+2900 – U+297F — Supplemental Arrows-B
- U+2980 – U+29FF — Miscellaneous Mathematical Symbols-B
- U+2A00 – U+2AFF — Supplemental Mathematical Operators
- U+2B00 – U+2BFF — Miscellaneous Symbols and Arrows
- U+2E80 – U+2EFF — CJK Radicals Supplement
- U+2F00 – U+2FDF — Kangxi Radicals
- U+4DC0 – U+4DFF — Yijing Hexagram Symbols
- U+A700 – U+A71F — Modifier Tone Letters
- U+FE50 – U+FE6F — Small Form Variants
- U+FE70 – U+FEFF — Arabic Presentation Forms-B
- U+FF00 – U+FFEF — Halfwidth and Fullwidth Forms
- U+FFF0 – U+FFFF — Specials
- U+10100 – U+1013F — Aegean Numbers
- U+10140 – U+1018F — Ancient Greek Numbers
- U+10190 – U+101CF — Ancient Symbols
- U+10400 – U+1044F — Deseret
- U+10450 – U+1047F — Shavian
- U+1D100 – U+1D1FF — Musical Symbols
- U+1D300 – U+1D35F — Tai Xuan Jing Symbols
- U+1D360 – U+1D37F — Counting Rod Numerals
- U+1D400 – U+1D7FF — Mathematical Alphanumeric Symbols

== History ==
Apple lists this font as copyrighted 2003.

=== Mac OS X 10.3 ===
Apple Symbols was introduced with the following:

- General Punctuation
- Currency Symbols
- Letterlike Symbols
- Arrows
- Mathematical Operators
- Optical Character Recognition
- Box Drawing
- Block Elements
- Geometric Shapes
- Miscellaneous Symbols
- Deseret

=== Mac OS X 10.4 ===
Version 5.0d5e1 contains glyph variants and new glyphs for the following Unicode blocks:

- Braille Patterns
- Yijing Hexagram Symbols
- Small Form Variants
- Musical Symbols
- Tai Xuan Jing Symbols

=== Mac OS X 10.5 ===
Apple Symbols was significantly extended for its Mac OS X 10.5 “Leopard” release—version 6.0d7e4 (2007/08/03)—and had its glyph repertoire more than tripled. As well as additions to the Unicode blocks partially covered by earlier releases, the font included new glyphs for Latin, Greek, Shavian, and the following Unicode blocks:

- U+02B0 – U+02FF — Spacing Modifier Letters
- U+0300 – U+036F — Combining Diacritical Marks
- U+2070 – U+209F — Superscripts and Subscripts
- U+2150 – U+218F — Number Forms
- U+2300 – U+23FF — Miscellaneous Technical
- U+2400 – U+243F — Control Pictures
- U+27C0 – U+27EF — Miscellaneous Mathematical Symbols-A
- U+27F0 – U+27FF — Supplemental Arrows-A
- U+2900 – U+297F — Supplemental Arrows-B
- U+2980 – U+29FF — Miscellaneous Mathematical Symbols-B
- U+2A00 – U+2AFF — Supplemental Mathematical Operators
- U+2B00 – U+2BFF — Miscellaneous Symbols and Arrows
- U+2E80 – U+2EFF — CJK Radicals Supplement
- U+2F00 – U+2FDF — Kangxi Radicals
- U+A700 – U+A71F — Modifier Tone Letters
- U+FE70 – U+FEFF — Arabic Presentation Forms-B
- U+FF00 – U+FFEF — Halfwidth and Fullwidth Forms
- U+FFF0 – U+FFFF — Specials
- U+10100 – U+1013F — Aegean Numbers
- U+10140 – U+1018F — Ancient Greek Numbers
- U+10190 – U+101CF — Ancient Symbols
- U+1D360 – U+1D37F — Counting Rod Numerals
- U+1D400 – U+1D7FF — Mathematical Alphanumeric Symbols

== See also ==
- Font Book
