= New York (1983 typeface) =

- Category: Serif
- Classification: Transitional
- Designer: Susan Kare
- Foundry: Apple Computer
- Date created: 1983, 1988

New York is a transitional serif typeface designed in 1983 for the Macintosh computer by Susan Kare and reworked in 1988 by Charles Bigelow and Kris Holmes. The typeface was the standard bitmap serif font for the early Macintosh operating systems. Originally titled “Ardmore”, it was renamed to New York before its initial release as part of the "World Class Cities" naming scheme by Apple Computer cofounder Steve Jobs.

Designed as a bitmap face, New York was later released in TrueType format, though the design differed from the bitmap version.

In 2019, Apple made a new serif typeface available, also named New York, although the designs are unrelated.

The Fox Broadcasting Company network used the font in its on-air promotion graphics during the early 2000s.

== See also ==
- Apple typography
- San Francisco (sans-serif typeface)
