= New York (2019 typeface) =

Serif typeface introduced in 2019

- Category: Serif
- Classification: Transitional
- Foundry: Apple Inc.
- Date released: 2018 (Apple Books); 2019 (developer use)
- Variations: New York Small; New York Medium; New York Large; New York Extra Large
- Also known as: SF Serif; Serif UI
- Website: https://developer.apple.com/fonts/
- Latest release version: 17.0d5e1

New York is a transitional serif typeface created by Apple Inc. It is a serif variant of San Francisco (SF Pro) typeface. It was released to developers in June 2019. It is released by Apple freely but solely for use in developing or creating mock-ups of software on Apple platforms.

Originally named SF Serif and Serif UI, it was first showcased in WWDC 2018 on June 4, 2018 when the new Apple Books app was introduced. It was exclusive to Apple Books on iOS 12; as a result, it was not available for download on the Apple Developer site. It was later released in four optical sizes with six weights each, under the name New York in June 2019 on the Apple Developer site. The font includes OpenType features for lining and text figures in both proportional and tabular widths.

Despite Apple having created a typeface with the same name with the bitmap format for the original Macintosh, it is unrelated to this design.

On March 28, 2023, Apple Music Classical was released, which uses the New York font.

A semi-rounded version exists, primarily used for the Lock Screen since iOS 26.

== Usage ==
Similar to usage of the San Francisco font, Apple also limits the usage of New York by others. According to its license, it is restricted to the design and development of applications for Apple's platforms.

== See also ==
- Typography of Apple Inc.
- San Francisco (sans-serif typeface)
