= Dogcow =

Symbol on early Apple operating systems

Original Clarus the Dogcow

The dogcow, named Clarus, is a bitmapped image designed by Apple for the demonstration of page layout in the classic Mac OS. The sound it makes is "Moof!", a blend of "moo" and "woof". Clarus became the archetype of surrealistic humor in the corporate culture of the original Macintosh group, particularly as the mascot of Apple’s Developer Technical Support as officially documented in Technote #31.

== History ==
In 1983, the dog icon had been created by Susan Kare as the glyph for "z", as part of the Cairo font. Later, when redesigning the classic Mac OS "Page Setup" print dialog box for the LaserWriter, an example image was required. According to HCI engineer Annette Wagner,

For the LaserWriter there was a print dialog with checkbox options that could all be mixed with each other. We needed some kind of graphic that would show flipping horizontal, flipping vertical, 2% reduction, mirror effects, six or eight kinds of effects. We had this typeface of crazy symbols that came off the Macintosh that Susan Kare had originally done, that had all these crazy critters inside it. I had to alter the dog image pretty significantly, not only to make it larger but to give it a clear front, clear back, clear top, clear bottom, and I had to change the spots on the dog specifically so that when the 2% reduction was in effect you could clearly tell the difference.

— Oral history of Annette Wagner

The new dog graphic had a more bovine look.

Did they have a heated conversation and holler "Dog!" "Cow!" "Dog!" "Cow!" back and forth? We may never know. But one thing is clear, Mr. Zimmerman finally gave in and said, "It's both, OK? It's called a 'dogcow.' Now will you get out of my office?"

— History of the Dogcow, Part 1

On October 15, 1987, the term "dogcow" was coined by Scott Zimmerman. She was later named Clarus by Mark "The Red" Harlan, as a joking reference to Claris, Apple's business unit for office software at the time.

The Clarus icon became one of the giant pieces of pixel art in the Icon Garden that existed in the front yard of the Apple Campus at 1 Infinite Loop from 1993 to 1998.

There is a reference to the dogcow in the documentation for the Swift programming language, which uses the word "dogcow" as an example of the use of Unicode characters to name constants and variables; and in a sticker pack in Messages.

"Smooth" Clarus in macOS Ventura

In the first beta of macOS Ventura, the dogcow returned to the page setup window, and in iOS 16 entering 'Clarus' or 'Moof' results in the keyboard suggesting the 'dog' and 'cow' Emoji.

A dogcow Easter egg was introduced in the iOS 27 and macOS Golden Gate release candidates. Within the Liquid Glass appearance settings, scrolling past the bottom of the preview window reveals an image of Clarus rendered in 3D at Apple Park, accompanied by the text "Moof!" appearing in the search bar.

== Overview ==
There is a life-size picture of a dogcow conveniently located in the Finder. Look under "Page Setup..." Now look under "Options." Walla [sic], there is the dogcow in all its raging glory. Like any talented dog, it can do flips. Like any talented cow, it can do precision bitmap alignment.

— Apple Technote 31

Some people say that the dogcow hails from the sunny shores of the Middle of Nowhere. This location in the south Atlantic can be found in the Map control panel; simply type "Middle of Nowhere" and click Find. (For a small fee, these same people will tell you where they last saw Elvis.)

— Develop magazine

The sound she makes is "Moof!", and in early versions of Apple Developer CDs one section was known as "Moof!".

The dogcow symbol and "Moof!" were proprietary trademarks of Apple until the registration was cancelled in 1999.

== Reception ==
The disappearance of the Icon Garden and of Clarus from Apple's products is seen by MacWorld as a symbol of the draining of culture and character from, and an increase in blankness and austerity in, Apple's products over the years. In a 2015 retrospective, the magazine said Clarus "came into being through quirkiness and serendipity, and you could say it has no business in a grown-up, commercial operating system. It makes no real sense, and wasn’t really there on merit or through strategic planning" and represented a company that was "kooky", "idiosyncratic", and not dominated by rules.

== See also ==
- Sad Mac
