= San Francisco (decorative typeface) =

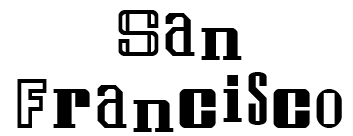
- Category: Display
- Designer: Susan Kare
- Foundry: Apple Computer
- Date released: 1984
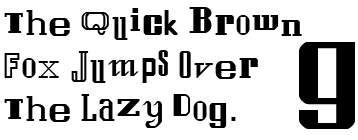
- Sample

San Francisco is one of the original bitmap typefaces for the Apple Macintosh computer released in 1984. It was designed by Susan Kare to mimic the ransom-note effect and was used in early Mac software demos and Apple company flyers. An official TrueType version was never made, and San Francisco was rendered obsolete with the arrival of System 7.

== See also ==
- Samples of display typefaces
