= Fallback font =

Type of reserve typeface

A fallback font is a reserve typeface containing symbols for as many Unicode characters as possible. When a display system encounters a character that is not part of the repertoire of any of the other available fonts, a symbol from a fallback font is used instead. Typically, a fallback font will contain symbols representative of the various types of Unicode characters.

Systems that do not offer a fallback font typically display black or white rectangles, question marks, the Unicode Replacement Character (U+FFFD), or nothing at all, in place of missing characters. Placing one or more fallback fonts at the end of a list of preferred fonts ensures that there are no missing characters.

== Unicode BMP Fallback font ==
0 0
2 0

The Unicode BMP Fallback font is a Unicode font that was originally created for debugging purposes. It contains a glyph for every character in the Unicode Basic Multilingual Plane. Each glyph consists of a box containing the four hexadecimal digits corresponding to the Unicode value. The example to the left is a mock-up of the glyph for a space character (U+0020).

Unlike the Unicode Last Resort font, the Unicode BMP Fallback font displays a different glyph for each different Unicode character, but cannot display all Unicode characters. Because four hexadecimal digits can only represent 65K characters (0000=0, FFFF=65,535) the Unicode BMP Fallback is limited to the 65K characters in the Unicode Basic Multilingual Plane.

== Unicode Last Resort font ==
Sample glyphs from Apple's Last Resort font.

As of Unicode version 5.0, the Unicode consortium provides a fallback font to represent types of Unicode characters. This is a version of the macOS Last Resort system font, modified to work on non-Apple platforms and made available by Apple via the Unicode Consortium.

The symbols provided by the Unicode Last Resort font place glyphs into categories based on their location in the Unicode system and provide a hint to the user about which font or script is required to view the unavailable characters. The symbols provided by the Unicode Last Resort font are square with rounded corners with a bold outline. In the left and right sides of the outline, the Unicode range that the character belongs to is given using hexadecimal digits. Top and bottom are used for one or two descriptions of the Unicode block. A symbol representative of the block is centered inside the square.

Unlike the Unicode BMP Fallback font or the GNU Unifont, the Unicode Last Resort font displays the same glyph for many different Unicode characters. Using this one-glyph-per-block generalization allows the Unicode Last Resort font to contain a glyph for every character in Unicode despite the fact that the total number of Unicode characters exceeds the address space of an sfnt (TrueType and OpenType) font structure, which has a 16-bit glyph index that can store a maximum of 65,536 glyphs. Unicode now has over 100,000 defined characters, with a potential address space of over one million characters—over 15 times the sfnt size limit. Unicode Last Resort Font will therefore not break as Unicode continues to grow and the Basic Multilingual Plane (BMP) and surrogate planes fill up further.

=== Apple's Last Resort font ===
Apple's Last Resort font is a system font for the Macintosh operating systems that is identical to the Unicode Last Resort font (which was created for the Unicode consortium by Apple).

Apple's Last Resort font was first included in Mac OS 8.5 in 1998, for the benefit of applications using Apple Type Services for Unicode Imaging (ATSUI). It is also used in macOS. In 2001, for Mac OS X 10.1 the Last Resort font design was revised to include the border text and was re-digitized, and extended by Michael Everson of Evertype, who continues to update it with each new release of Unicode.

=== Unicode Consortium versions ===
Since version 13.000, the font family is released under SIL Open Font License 1.1.

The family includes Last Resort, Last Resort High-Efficiency. Last Resort High-Efficiency uses Format 13 (Many-to-one range mappings) 'cmap' (character to glyph index mapping) table, which reduces the size of the font, but may not be compatible with some environments.

==== Releases ====
- 13.000 (2020-10-08): Supports Unicode Version 13.0.0. Only Format 13 cmap table is included.
- 13.001 (2020-10-22): Added Last Resort High-Efficiency. Both fonts include Format 4 cmap table, with Last Resort includes Format 12 cmap table and LRHE includes Format 13 cmap table.
- 14.000 (2021-12-01): Supports Unicode Version 14.0.0. Added 12 glyphs for 12 new blocks. Modified 2 glyphs in 2 existing blocks (Ahom, Tangut Supplement).
- 15.000 (2022-09-13): Supports Unicode Version 15.0.0. 'meta' table was removed. Added 7 glyphs for 7 new blocks. Modified 6 glyphs in 6 existing blocks (Egyptian Hieroglyph Format Controls, Number Forms, Mathematical Operators Supplement, Variation Selectors, CJK Unified Ideographs Extension F, Variation Selectors Supplement).
- 15.100 (2023-09-11): Supports Unicode Version 15.1.0. Added one new glyph that corresponds to the newly added CJK Unified Ideographs Extension I block; 627 mappings that correspond to the 627 new characters in Unicode Version 15.1 were changed.
- 16.000 (2024-09-10): Supports Unicode Version 16.0.0. Added 10 new glyphs for 10 new blocks. 5,185 mappings were changed.
- 17.000 (2025-09-09): Supports Unicode Version 17.0.0.
- 18.000 (2026-09-16): Supports Unicode Version 18.0.0. Added 7 glyphs for 7 new blocks (Bengali Supplement, Archaic Cuneiform Numerals, Jurchen, Jurchen Radicals, Musical Symbols Supplement, Miscellaneous Symbols and Arrows Extended, Seal). Modified 1 glyph in 1 existing block (Counting Rod Numerals). 13,007 mappings were changed.

== If all else fails: the notdef glyph ==
If an application does not have access to a glyph for a required codepoint in any available font, the character should be shown as the .notdef glyph, 􏿮. This often appears as an empty box, ☐ (nicknamed "tofu" based on the shape), a box with an X in it, ☒, a diamond with a question mark, �, or a box with a question mark in it, ⍰.

== See also ==
- Arial Unicode MS – Neo-grotesque sans-serif typeface
- Code2000 – Pan-Unicode digital font
- Font substitution – Used when the primary font is deficient
- Fonts on Macintosh (Apple system)
- GNU Unifont – Duospaced bitmap font
- Mojibake – Garbled text as a result of incorrect character encodings
- Noto fonts – Multilingual font family from Google
- Open-source Unicode typefaces
- Representative glyph – Non-specific archetype to represent a grapheme
- Unicode – Character encoding standard
- Unicode font – Computer font that maps glyphs to code points defined in the Unicode Standard
