= Font Book =

MacOS font manager

- Font Book 10.0 under macOS 11
- Stable release: 11.0
- Operating system: macOS
- Type: Font manager
- Website: www.apple.com/macosx/features/fontbook/

Font Book is a font manager by Apple for its macOS operating system. It was first released with Mac OS X Panther in 2003.

== Features ==
Font Book is opened by default whenever the user clicks on a new .otf or .ttf font file. The user can view the font and install it, at which point the font will be copied to a centralized folder of user-installed fonts and be available for all apps to use.

It can be used to browse all installed fonts. The user can view the list of fonts and see their alphabets, their complete repertoire of characters, and how they set a sample text of the user's choice.

The program allows users to:

- Group fonts into collections, which can then be used in all Cocoa programs
- View details of fonts, such as the designer's name
- Activate and deactivate individual fonts or collections
- Check the data integrity of font files
- Export font collections for use on another computer

It does not feature any editing tools, even for changing font properties. This means that it cannot be used to rename, merge, or split up fonts or to redesign or modify fonts by (for example) changing kerning rules or exporting small capitals into a separate style.

== History ==
Until 2007, Apple's Font Book faced some criticism for its inability to validate and auto-activate fonts.

These features were added to Font Book with the release of Mac OS X Leopard on October 26, 2007.
