= Ransom note effect =

Term in typography

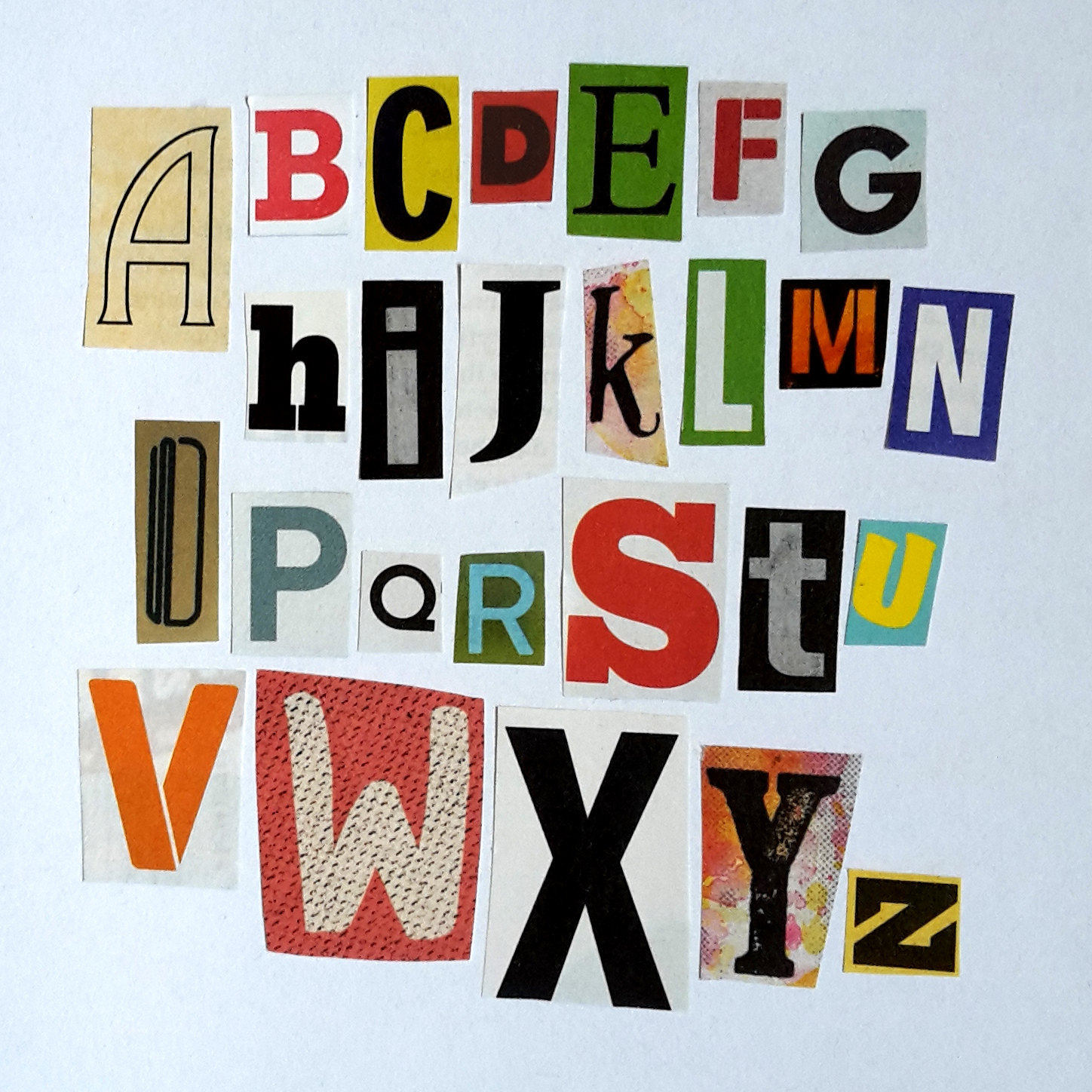
Letters cut randomly from a magazine create the ransom note effect.

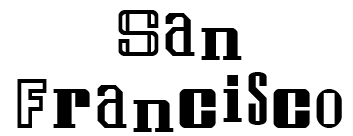
The typeface San Francisco replicates the ransom note effect.

In typography, the ransom note effect is the result of using an excessive number of juxtaposed typefaces. It takes its name from the appearance of a stereotypical ransom note or poison pen letter, with the message formed from words or letters cut randomly from a magazine or a newspaper in order to avoid using recognizable handwriting.

The term is also used in a pejorative manner to describe poor typesetting or layout created by an untrained Web developer or desktop publishing user. The software industry discovered that the drawback to placing "professional publishing tools" in the hands of "people with no graphic design" training or education was that "all too often users mixed all sorts of things together, just because they could". However, the problem has long been recognized in classical typography and examples of such layouts can be found in handbills from the 18th and 19th centuries.

Early versions of Macintosh system software, up through System 7, included a bitmapped font called San Francisco that replicated the ransom note effect. The font was not carried over into later versions of Mac OS. Microsoft similarly had a Ransom typeface commissioned in 1992.

The ransom note effect may also occur when a web browser uses different fonts to display parts of a web page in different languages or encodings (or if a language uses glyphs from different code blocks, as is the case with Ancient Greek). To avoid this, web browsers try to use the same font for as much of the page as possible.
