= Skia (typeface) =

Humanist sans-serif typeface

- Category: Sans-serif
- Designer: Matthew Carter
- Foundry: Apple Computer
- Date created: 1994
- Variations: Cadmus

Skia is a humanist sans-serif typeface designed by Matthew Carter for Apple Computer in 1994. Skia is Greek for "shadow", and the letterforms take inspiration from stone-carved 1st century BC Greek writing. The typeface was the first QuickDraw GX font, and has been pre-installed in Mac operating systems since System 7.5 (1994).

Skia includes "GX variations" technology that–if an application offers the UI–allows its weight to be adjusted smoothly between thin and bold, and its width between narrow and extended. (Adobe's "multiple master" technology was similar.) In 2016 it was announced that several technology companies, including Google, Microsoft and Adobe, were adopting Apple's GX variations as the basis of the variations specification inside OpenType 1.8, and since that announcement Skia had been used to demonstrate the capabilities of the technology.
