= EWorld =

Former Apple service

Logo of eWorld

eWorld was an online service operated by Apple Inc. between June 1994 and March 1996. The services included email (eMail Center), news, software installs and a bulletin board system (Community Center). Users of eWorld were often referred to as "ePeople."

Based on a similar service from America Online, eWorld was expensive compared to other services and not well marketed, and failed to attract a high number of subscribers. The service was only available on Apple's Macintosh and Apple IIGS and had limited support on the Newton MessagePad handheld devices, though a PC version had been planned.

== History ==
eWorld version 1.0 installation came as a set of two floppy disks.

In the early 1990s, online services were becoming widely popular, just as Apple was looking into replacing their aging online service known as AppleLink. AppleLink had originally been developed at the urging of Jon Ebbs, Apple's head of support, who convinced the management that they could lower support costs using an online service. AppleLink had initially been available only to dealers when it launched in 1985, but was later opened to developers and became the de facto internal e-mail service within Apple.

The "back end" of AppleLink was hosted by GE Information Services who charged Apple about $300,000 a year, as well as charging the end users up to $15 for daytime access to the system. Apple had tried to negotiate a better rate on several occasions, but GE knew that switching would cost Apple even more, and refused to lower the costs.

Nevertheless, Apple began to implement changes. Before the advent of eWorld, Apple had started a consumer-oriented online support service known as AppleLink Personal Edition. Related to the older system in name only, this service was run by Quantum Computer Services, who earlier had established the Q-Link online service for the Commodore 64 personal computer. Quantum's Steve Case moved to California for three months to convince Apple to let Quantum run their new consumer service. In 1987, Apple allowed Quantum to run the service and granted them use of the Apple logo. Apple received a 10% royalty for all the system's users while Quantum generated revenue by running the service.

The ideologies of the companies soon clashed. Quantum wanted to bundle the AppleLink software with new Macs and distribute it through direct marketing. At the time Apple did not believe in giving away non-system software for free. That, coupled with Apple's strict design guidelines, caused Quantum to eventually terminate their contract. Steve Case had, however, negotiated a rather beneficial contract, granting Quantum rights to the use of the Apple logo and preventing Apple from marketing its own online service.

In 1991, Quantum was renamed America Online and the service was opened up to PC and Macintosh users. Apple wanted out of their contract with GE, which was costing them far more money than it was saving, and wanted to provide their own Mac-only competition to AOL's service. They canceled their GE contract and formed an Online Services Group. The group licensed the original AppleLink Personal Edition software from AOL and developed it into what would be known as eWorld. The group also struck a deal with AOL to help develop the service and spent 1993 working on the new software and various services to be offered. According to an AOL press release on January 5, 1994, eWorld was "created using technology licensed from America Online. The two companies have been collaborating to build the platform for Apple’s online services since December 1992, when America Online granted Apple a non-exclusive license to use the company’s interactive services platform."

On January 5, 1994, Apple announced eWorld at the 1994 Macworld Conference & Expo, where they invited attendees to become beta testers for the service. On June 20 of that year, the service went into full operation. The eWorld service was a combination of the vast technical and support archives of the previous AppleLink services and a more traditional community service like AOL and CompuServe. The eWorld service was only accessible from Macs and in parts, Newton OS-operated devices. A Windows version was promised to appear in 1995; it never left the early beta stage.

== Features ==
The main screen of the eWorld service

The primary portal of the service was the eWorld software. The software was based around a "town hall" metaphor where each of the service’s branches was an individual "building". Over 400 media and technology companies created information products on the service. Several Mac software and hardware companies opened up virtual forums on the service to provide customer support and general product information to subscribers. The main eWorld portal also encompassed a wide variety of news and information services.

In addition to information access, two heavily used areas of eWorld were the eMail Center and Community Center. The Community Center offered chat rooms and an online BBS where thousands of "ePeople" (eWorld users) congregated to chat about various subjects. The eMail Center was a virtual post office. The service also housed support and Apple technical documents.

The eWorld Web Browser, introduced in eWorld 1.1 as part of its ‘Internet On-Ramp’ features, let users browse web pages on Internet websites. The browser had features for FTP uploading, web images and settings to configure a default homepage address. Though separate from the main eWorld application, the browser worked only through an eWorld connection, not through any other network or online service.

eWorld's unique user experience was developed by Cleo Huggins, manager of human interface group in the development team. Cleo also coined the name eWorld. The signature illustrations were created by Mark Drury. The development team was led by Scott Converse, and the product management team by Richard Gingras. The eWorld project at Apple was led by Peter Friedman.

== Demise ==
The service cost $8.95 per month, which included two free night-time or weekend hours. Subsequent hours were $4.95 with weekday hours (6 am–6 pm) costing $7.95. Apple kept the price high originally to keep the demand moderated but never dropped the price when the demand did not materialize. After the first year of service, eWorld had 90,000 subscribers. In 1995, limited Internet service was made available, and as of September 1995 the service had 115,000 subscribers, compared to 3.5 million subscribers of AOL (including one million outside the United States).

Apple's marketing and promotion efforts were at best indifferent. The service was only available on the Macintosh, along with e-mail and system update support on the Newton handheld. Apple was in a challenging financial position at the time and CEO Michael Spindler told the Online Services Group that significant marketing for the service could not be provided so eWorld shipped on new Macs with only an icon on the desktop and a brochure in the box. There was also little if anything in the way of media marketing for the service. The promised Windows version of eWorld was not launched following a decision by Apple's senior management to position eWorld as a unique service for Macintosh owners.

Apple's management decided that the product was doomed to fail in a market where AOL had such a commanding lead. The company was also cutting costs. In June 1995, the company had over $1 billion in backorders and posted a $68 million loss in the fourth quarter of 1995. In January 1996, Spindler was asked to resign as CEO, replaced by former CEO of National Semiconductor Gil Amelio. Several products and projects were scrapped in an effort to put the company back into the black.

On March 31, 1996, at 12:01 am Pacific Time, the service was officially shut down. Remaining eWorld subscribers were offered incentives to switch to AOL, which had already been hosting Macintosh-oriented content within the Mac Forums of its Computing Channel. The eWorld/AppleLink technical support archives moved to Apple's website. When the Online Services Group was disbanded, many of its members left Apple. Peter Friedman eventually formed chat community website TalkCity with Chris Christensen and Jenna Woodul. Scott Converse became a senior executive at Paramount Pictures Digital Entertainment Division. James Isaacs joined Danger Inc. (acquired by Microsoft in 2008). Richard Gingras and Jonathan Rosenberg joined the newly formed broadband access venture @Home Network.

As of August 2025, 28 years after its discontinuation, attempting to access the eWorld.com website still automatically redirects to the apple.com homepage.

== See also ==
- Microsoft Bob
- Skeuomorph
