= Myriad (typeface) =

Humanist sans-serif typeface

Adobe Myriad
- Category: Sans-serif
- Classification: Humanist
- Designers: Robert Slimbach; Carol Twombly
- Foundry: Adobe Type
- Date released: 1992
- Design based on: Frutiger

Myriad is a humanist sans-serif typeface designed by Robert Slimbach and Carol Twombly for Adobe Systems. Myriad was intended as a neutral, general-purpose typeface that could fulfill a range of uses and have a form easily expandable by computer-aided design to a large range of weights and widths.

Myriad is known for its usage by Apple Inc., replacing Apple Garamond as Apple's corporate font from April 29, 2002, to January 24, 2017. Myriad is easily distinguished from other sans-serif fonts due to its "y" descender (tail) and slanting "e" cut.

== Design ==
Myriad is a humanist sans-serif, a relatively informal design taking influences from handwriting. Its letterforms are open rather than "folded-up" on the nineteenth-century grotesque sans-serif model, and its sloped form is a "true italic" based on handwriting. The 'g' is single-storey and the 'M' has sloped sides on the model of Roman square capitals. As a family intended for body text and influenced by traditional book printing, text figures are included as well as lining figures at cap height. Twombly described the design process as one of swapping ideas to create a "homogeneous" design but said that in retrospect she found the experience "too hard" to want to repeat.

Myriad is similar to Adrian Frutiger's famous Frutiger typeface, although the italic is a true italic unlike Frutiger's oblique; Frutiger described it as "not badly done" but felt that the similarities had gone "a little too far". The later Segoe UI and Corbel are also similar.

Adobe’s first release of Myriad in 1992 was in the multiple master format, an ambitious format intended to allow the user to fine-tune weight, width and other characteristics of the design to their preferred form. The Multiple Master format was not well supported by third-party applications, and so most releases of Myriad have been in the form of separate font files. The concept behind Multiple Master fonts has since been redeveloped as part of the OpenType variable fonts technology.

== Variations ==
=== Myriad (Type 1) ===
This PostScript Type 1 font family was released after the original Myriad MM. It initially included four fonts in two weights, with complementary italics. All these Type 1 versions supported the ISO-Adobe character set; all were discontinued in the early 2000s.

Myriad Condensed
It was a condensed version, released around 1998. The condensed fonts comprise three weights, with complementary italics.
Myriad Headline
A "Headline" version was also released, which has the weight of Myriad Bold, but slightly narrower.

=== Myriad Web ===
Myriad Web is a version of Myriad in TrueType font format, optimized for onscreen use. It supports Adobe CE and Adobe Western 2 character sets. Myriad Web comprises only five fonts: Myriad Web Pro Bold, Myriad Web Pro Regular, Myriad Web Pro Condensed Italic, Myriad Web Pro Condensed, Myriad Web Pro Italic. Myriad Web Pro is slightly wider than Myriad Pro, while the width of Myriad Web Pro Condensed is between Myriad Pro Condensed and Myriad Pro SemiCondensed.

The family is bundled as part of the Adobe Web Type Pro font pack.

=== Myriad Pro ===
Myriad Pro is the OpenType version of the original Myriad font family. It first shipped in 2000, as Adobe moved towards the OpenType standard. Additional designers were Christopher Slye and Fred Brady. Compared to Myriad MM, it added support for Latin Extended, Greek, and Cyrillic characters, as well as oldstyle figures. Latin Y and Greek Υ are distinctive.

Myriad Pro originally included thirty fonts in three widths and five weights each, with complementary italics. A "semi-condensed" width was added in early 2002, expanding the family to forty fonts in four widths and five weights each, with complementary italics.

Myriad Pro Regular, Bold, Italic and Bold Italic are bundled with Adobe Reader 7 and 8. In Adobe Reader 9 and onwards, the fonts are included, but not installed in the system fonts directory.

=== Myriad Wild ===
Myriad Wild is an Adobe font package comprising the Myriad Sketch and Myriad Tilt fonts in Type 1 format. Myriad Sketch is a slightly irregular outline version of Myriad, while Myriad Tilt incorporates irregular stroke weight and paths. The family supports ISO-Adobe character set.

Myriad Wild Std
The OpenType version of Myriad Wild. It supports Adobe Western 2 character set.

=== MyriadCAD ===
MyriadCAD is included in Adobe Reader 9 and is thought to be an implementation of the ANSI CAD lettering. It is also available in the current Adobe Acrobat.

=== Myriad Currency ===
Myriad Currency is included in Adobe Reader 9 and is thought to be the company's embedded font for their currency typefaces. It can be found in the Fonts subfolder of the Resources folder under Adobe Reader 9 from the Program Files folder in the Local Hard Disk Drive.

=== Myriad Arabic ===
Myriad Arabic was designed by Robert Slimbach, with the help of Adobe's technical team as well as outside Arabic experts. The principal outside consultant was Dr. Mamoun Sakkal. Five weights of Myriad Arabic (which include Latin-alphabet characters) were licensed by Apple for inclusion with macOS, but must be manually enabled by the user.

=== Myriad Hebrew ===
Myriad Hebrew is an extension of Adobe's popular humanist sans-serif typeface Myriad, bringing the sensibility of Myriad into another language and another writing system. Myriad Hebrew is one of the most extensive families of Hebrew typefaces available today, comprising twenty different digital fonts: four weights, each with two italic complements; plus an informal cursive version, also in four weights, with both upright and slanted variants. Myriad Hebrew was designed by Robert Slimbach, with the help of Adobe's technical team as well as outside Hebrew experts. The principal outside consultant was Scott-Martin Kosofsky.

=== Myriad Apple, Myriad Set, and Myriad Set Pro ===
In 2002, Myriad Apple was introduced as Apple's new corporate typeface. In 2006, Myriad Apple was replaced with Myriad Set. It was later expanded into Myriad Set Pro. It is available in Bold, Medium, Thin, Text, Semibold and Ultralight weights with corresponding italics, and could be found on most of Apple's websites until 2017, when it was replaced with Apple's new San Francisco font family.

=== Kozuka Gothic ===
Kozuka Gothic is a Japanese typeface, designed as a sans-serif companion to Kozuka Mincho family. The Japanese letters were designed by Masahiko Kozuka and Adobe's Japanese type design team. The Latin letters in Kozuka Gothic were adapted from Myriad.

Kozuka Gothic Std
An OpenType version of the Kozuka Gothic font family

Kozuka Gothic Pro (2001)
A version of Kozuka Gothic with Adobe-Japan1-4 character set support.

Kozuka Gothic Pr6N (2008)
A version of Kozuka Gothic updated to support Adobe-Japan1-6 and JIS X 0213:2004 character sets. It was shipped with Adobe Creative Suite 4. Retail versions began available as of 2011.

=== Adobe Heiti ===
Adobe Heiti is a simplified Chinese typeface that borrows its Latin glyphs from Myriad. It is included with Adobe Illustrator CS3, Adobe Reader 8 Simplified Chinese font pack, Adobe Creative Suite 4.0.

Adobe Fan Heiti
Changes from Adobe Heiti include uniform stroke widths for Chinese characters.

== Usage ==
Adobe's Myriad was Apple's main brand font from 2003 to 2016.

Myriad is used in Rolls-Royce's text-based logo.

Myriad is used in Kharkiv Metro information signage

- From the launch of the eMac in 2002, Myriad Apple replaced Apple Garamond as Apple Inc.'s corporate font. It was once used in all of Apple's marketing and on its products (See Apple typography). Between 2004 and 2007, iPods with color displays used Podium Sans, a clone of Myriad, in the user interface. In 2006, Myriad Apple was superseded by Myriad Set, later updated to Myriad Set Pro. Beginning in 2015, it was replaced by the Apple-designed San Francisco.
- Myriad was the official font of the Beijing 2008 Summer Olympics.
- Myriad is used in all signage at Gatwick Airport.
- Myriad Black is one of two official standard fonts of the University of Virginia and Loyola University Chicago.
- Myriad is also one of the two official standard fonts of Cambridge University.
- Myriad is the official sans-serif font of University of Delaware.
- Myriad Pro is the wordmark logo font for The University of Iowa and the primary typeface for University of Nevada, Reno and the University of Ottawa.
- Myriad Roman, Myriad Italic, and Myriad Headline are primary sans-serif fonts at The George Washington University.
- Two variants of Myriad MM are used as the primary typefaces for the Carl von Ossietzky University of Oldenburg (Germany).
- All Nippon Airways, a Japanese airline, also uses the Myriad font for their new international cabin class logos as well as promotional materials of its new "Inspiration of JAPAN" in-flight service concept.
- The Order of St John adopted the new St John logo in 2005, choosing Myriad Regular (Roman) and Myriad Bold as the approved organization's typeface for all external artwork, communications and publications. They have been using the new logo since 2005, and the organization's typeface since 2008 in their external publications. Establishments are following the order to change their organization's logo to the new St John logo and using the new typeface, like St John New Zealand, St John Ambulance in Wales, Hong Kong St. John Ambulance and The Order of St John USA.
- Myriad has been used since 2006 on vehicle registration plates in Norway.
- Myriad Pro is the official typeface of PKP Polskie Linie Kolejowe, the Polish national railway infrastructure manager. By default, train station signage uses the Semibold version, with additional text in English (and the language of a neighboring country in stations located near the border) set in Italic.
- Myriad Pro Light, Regular, Bold, and their Italic versions are used by the Polish long-distance train operator PKP Intercity in official printed materials.
- Myriad has been used since 2012 in Kharkiv Metro information signage.
- Myriad Pro was Walmart's corporate font until 2017, and a modified version was used in its logo until 2025.

== Awards ==
Myriad Pro won bukva:raz! 2001 under the Greek and Cyrillic categories.

Myriad Pro Greek won TDC2 2000 (Type Directors Club Type Design Competition 2000) in the Text/display type systems category.
