= Geneva (typeface) =

Neo-grotesque sans-serif typeface

- Category: Sans-serif
- Classification: Grotesque
- Designer: Susan Kare
- Foundry: Apple Computer
- Date created: 1983
- Date released: 1984

Geneva is a neo-grotesque or "industrial" sans-serif typeface designed by Susan Kare for Apple Computer. It is one of the oldest fonts shipped with Macintosh operating systems. The original version was a bitmap font, but later versions were converted to TrueType when that technology became available on the Macintosh platform. Because this Macintosh font is not commonly available on other platforms, many users find Verdana, Microsoft Sans Serif or Arial to be an acceptable substitute.

Unlike MS Sans Serif (formerly "Helv") as was used in Windows, the outline version of Geneva was not consistent in glyph shape with the original bitmap versions. The significant stylistic and metrics variations between the bitmap sizes made it difficult to create an outline version consistent with all of them.

- In 9-, 10- and 12-point sizes, the lowercase i, j and l had serifs on the top, the lowercase y had parallel sides, the central vertex of the uppercase M was much higher, and the 3 had a flat top (like in Chicago), among other differences. The 14- and 18-point sizes retained these letterforms save for the y whose sides were angular like in the outline form.
- In System 6 and earlier versions, the 24-point size had the same letterforms as the 14- and 18-point sizes. System 7 changed the 24-point size to a metrically-adjusted copy of the outline form.
- The release of Mac OS 8.5 in 1998 replaced 18-point bitmap Geneva with a metrically adjusted copy of the outline form. In the smaller sizes, some of the above characters were redesigned to appear as they do in the outline font, while others such as the 3 and uppercase M remained unchanged. This revision of bitmap Geneva is still available on recent macOS releases wherever antialiasing can be disabled (e.g. the Terminal app).

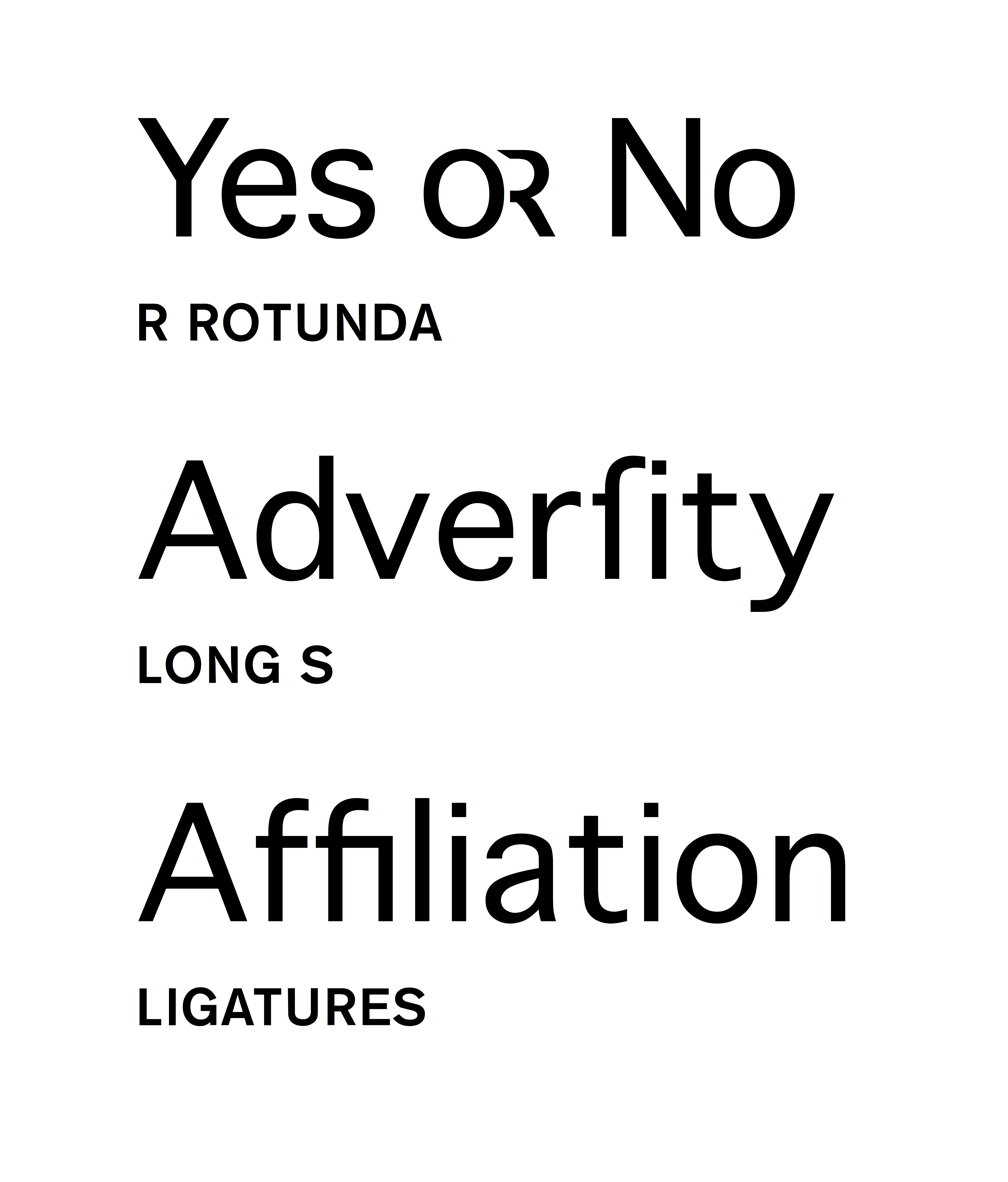
Geneva's long s and R rotunda, both descended from traditions in medieval writing.

Unusually for neo-grotesque faces, later versions of Geneva include a basic set of ligatures and the archaic long s and R rotunda as alternates.

A slightly modified version of Geneva, called Simple, was included in the Apple Newton operating system.

Osaka, a default Japanese gothic typeface for MacOS, also derived from Geneva typeface.
