= Charcoal (typeface) =

- Category: Sans-serif
- Designer: David Berlow
- Commissioned by: Apple Computer
- Foundry: Font Bureau
- Date created: 1995
- Design based on: Chicago font
- Variations: Virtue; Truth; Charcoal CY; Rostislav (Russia)

Charcoal is a sans-serif typeface designed by David Berlow of Font Bureau during the period 1994–1997. Charcoal was the default menu font in Apple Computer's Mac OS 8 and 9, replacing the comparatively harder-to-read Chicago as part of the new Platinum interface. In Mac OS X developer preview 3, it was replaced with Lucida Grande as the system typeface. Charcoal is designed for high legibility, even at smaller point sizes, displayed on computer monitors.

While similar in design to grotesque sans-serifs, Charcoal has a distinctive organic quality. The letterforms have a high x-height, a vertical axis, and maintain generous counter-form in and around the letterforms. Descending characters, g, j, p, q, and y are shallow, compensating for the high x-height, and allowing for reduced leading in text. While designed primarily for monitor display, Charcoal has had considerable popularity in print, including in letterpress printing.

The Mac OS X Server 1.0 version of Charcoal adds a hook to lowercase l and slashes the digit 0 to differentiate them from capital I and O respectively.

Virtue is a free TrueType font of similar design sometimes used as a surrogate on non-Apple systems.

== Truth ==
Truth, an expanded Charcoal family, is sold by Font Bureau, designed by David Berlow, and was released in 2005. It contains small differences from Charcoal, and is available in seven weights: Thin, Light, Regular, Medium, Bold, Black, and Ultra.
