= San Francisco (sans-serif typeface) =

Neo-grotesque sans-serif typeface

- Category: Sans-serif
- Classification: Neo-grotesque
- Foundry: Apple Inc.
- Date released: November 18, 2014
- License: Proprietary
- Design based on: Helvetica, FF DIN
- Variations: SF Pro; SF Condensed; SF Compressed; SF Expanded; SF Compact; SF Mono; SF Camera
- Also known as: SF
- Website: https://developer.apple.com/fonts/
- Latest release version: 20.0d10e1

San Francisco (also known as SF Pro) is a neo-grotesque sans-serif typeface made by Apple Inc. It was first released to developers on November 18, 2014. It is the first new typeface designed at Apple in nearly twenty years, and was inspired by Helvetica and FF DIN.

== Variants ==
Name	Type	Introduced	Common Usage
SF Pro or SF UI	Normal	2015	System font for Apple software
SF Condensed	Condensed	2016	Apple News, Stocks, Maps
SF Compressed	Compressed	2020	Apple News, Photos
SF Expanded	Expanded	2021	Maps, Photos, Music (2026-present)
SF Compact	Compact	2015	watchOS, Camera (iOS 9), Photos, keyboards, product text
SF Mono	Monospaced	2016	Monospaced body text in software such as Terminal, Console, and Xcode
SF Camera	Regular	2019	Camera (iOS 13)
SF TV	Regular	2025	Apple TV (service)

SF has the codename SFNS in macOS and SFUI in iOS, regardless of the official name.

Stylistic fonts exist, which are mainly present in the iOS 16 Lock Screen, Apple Cash, watchOS Watch Faces, and several promotional materials. These include chiseled, dotted, prisma, railed, slab-serif, and stenciled versions. Semi-rounded versions of the regular, railed, slab-serif, and stenciled versions also exist. Beyond this, other typefaces are used, such as a rounded geometric typeface used in watch faces, such as Numerals Duo, and a cursive typeface used for promotional materials and the setup screen since iOS 15.

Some variants have two optical sizes: "display" for large and "text" for small text. The letters in the "text" size have larger apertures and more generous letter-spacing than in the "display" size. The operating system automatically chooses the "display" size for sizes of at least 20 points and the "text" size for smaller size. Variable grades were eventually added in newer versions. A separate variable numeral font is used for the Lock Screen timer from iOS 26, where the numerals are boxier in regular widths, similar to SF Compact.

=== SF Pro/SF UI ===
UI font for macOS, iOS, iPadOS, and tvOS. In 2017, a revised version, SF Pro was introduced, supporting an expanded list of weights, optical sizes, glyphs and languages. SF Pro Text and SF Pro Display come in nine weights (the Text version had only six weights when introduced) plus corresponding italics. SF Pro Rounded (codename SFUIRounded), which comes in the same nine weights and has the same figure as the "Display" version but with rounded corners, was introduced in 2018.

These fonts, for use in different languages, can be found on the Apple website in their corresponding regions of use as variations of SF Pro:

- SF Pro AR and SF Pro TH are fonts for Arabic and Thai scripts respectively.
- SF Pro SC, SF Pro TC and SF Pro HK are Chinese fonts; they are labeled as the PingFang family.
- SF Pro JP is Japanese font; it is labeled as the AXIS Std family.
- SF Pro KR is Korean font; it is labeled as the Sandoll GothicNeo1 family.

SF Pro is a variable font that also has variable widths in conjunction with weights, optical sizes, and grades. One of them is a print-optimized variant, SF Hello, which is restricted to Apple employees and permitted contractors and vendors, and is therefore unavailable for public use. Additionally, since iOS 16, the variable typeface is used for the lock screen clock, alongside the Metropolitan typeface introduced in watchOS 9. This allows for additional fonts derived from SF Pro as shown below.

==== SF Condensed ====
A condensed variant of SF Pro. SF Condensed Text has six weights, while SF Condensed Display has nine. Variants are internally named SF Cash, SF Shields, and SF Condensed Photos.

==== SF Compressed ====
A compressed variant of SF Pro. Vertical edges are fully straight and kerning is much closer, unlike in SF Condensed.

==== SF Expanded ====
Internally called SF Wide, it is an extended/widened variant of SF Pro.

=== SF Compact ===
The initial version introduced with the Apple Watch and watchOS, later rebranded as SF Compact with the introduction of SF UI at WWDC 2015. Its characters' round curves are flatter than those of SF Pro, allowing the letters to be laid out with more space between them, thereby making the text more legible at small sizes, which the Apple Watch's small screen demands. SF Compact Rounded was introduced in 2016.

Like SF Pro after it, SF Compact comes in Text and Display optical sizes as well as a Rounded version with the same figure as the "Display" version but with rounded corners. All three versions each come in the same nine weights as SF Pro (the Text version had only six when introduced), and likewise only the "Text" and "Display" versions have corresponding italics.

=== SF Mono ===
A monospaced variant. UI font for the Terminal, Console, and Xcode applications. It was introduced at WWDC 2016. SF Mono comes in six weights with corresponding italics.

=== SF Camera ===
Introduced on September 10, 2019 at Apple's keynote; Phil Schiller mentioned it while summarizing the camera updates on iPhone 11 Pro. This variant has a boxier design than SF Pro, giving it an industrial and professional look. Its figure and tracking are similar to SF Compact Text. It was replaced with SF Compact Rounded in the Camera app in iOS 26.

=== New York ===
The 2019 'New York' typeface

New York is a serif font also created by Apple Inc. It was introduced as SF Serif (codename Serif UI) at WWDC 2018 as the UI font for the redesigned Apple Books app for iOS 12. It was officially released as 'New York' on the Apple Developer site on June 3, 2019. The typeface comes in Small, Medium, Large and Extra Large sizes, each in six weights and corresponding italics. It also includes OpenType features for lining and old-style figures in both proportional and tabular widths.

This typeface differs from, and is not related to, Apple's 1983 typeface named 'New York' for the original Macintosh.

== Variable fonts ==
Apple introduced the OpenType Font Variations feature of their SF fonts in WWDC20. It is included as a TrueType Font in the installer file on the Developer website. On WWDC22, variable width option is introduced to the font family.

- SF Pro feature variable weights, variable widths, and variable optical sizes of between "text" and "display".
- SF Pro Italic, and SF Compact feature variable weights and variable optical sizes of between "text" and "display".
- SF Compact Italic features variable weights but has "text" optical size only.
- New York and New York Italic feature variable weights and variable optical sizes between "small" and "extra large".

== SF Symbols ==
SF Symbols refers to symbols and icons used in the Apple operating systems. Apple's symbols are included as glyphs in the font file of SF Pro, SF Pro Rounded, SF Compact, and SF Compact Rounded (also in their variable font file). Each symbol is available in 3 sizes. These symbols change their thickness and negative space according to chosen weight and utilize the OpenType Variation feature. The SF Symbols app provides refined alignment, multicolor, and localization of symbols. Different arrangement of some Unicode code points result in different symbols when switching between variants, and some symbols have noticeably fewer details in some variants.

These symbols are available for developers to use in their apps on Apple platforms only. Developers are allowed to customize it to desired styles and colors, but certain symbols may not be modified and may only be used to refer to its respective Apple services or devices as listed in the license description.

== Usage ==
Since its introduction, San Francisco has gradually replaced most of Apple's other typefaces on their software and hardware products and for overall branding and has replaced Lucida Grande and Helvetica Neue as the system typeface of macOS and iOS since OS X El Capitan and iOS 9. Apple uses it on its website and for its product wordmarks, where it replaced Myriad Pro, which had been in use since 2002. It is also used on Magic Keyboard and on the keyboard of the 2015 MacBook and on the 2016 MacBook Pro, replacing VAG Rounded. It is also used as Apple's corporate typeface since 2017.

Apple restricts the usage of the typeface by others. It is licensed to registered third-party developers only for the design and development of applications for Apple's platforms. Only SF Pro, SF Compact, SF Mono, SF Arabic, SF Hebrew, SF Georgian, SF Armenian, and New York variants are available for download on Developer website and they are the only SF variants allowed to be used by developers.

The San Francisco Chronicle described the font as having nothing to do with the city and just being "Helvetica on a low-carb diet".

== See also ==
- Cantarell
- IBM Plex
- Roboto
- Noto
- Segoe
- Product Sans
- Typography of Apple Inc.
