= CoolType =

Software for legibility of text

CoolType is a software technology, introduced by Adobe Systems in 2000, to increase the legibility of text on color liquid-crystal displays (LCDs) like laptop or thin-film transistor (TFT) LCD monitors, especially to make reading long text, like E-Books, easier. Although it is primarily for LCDs, the legibility on cathode ray tube (CRT) monitors is also improved.

The main reason why Adobe built their own sub-pixel renderer is so they could display documents the same way across various operating systems: Windows, MacOS, Linux, etc. When it was launched, CoolType supported a wider range of fonts than Microsoft's ClearType, which was then limited to TrueType fonts, whereas Adobe's CoolType also supported PostScript fonts (and their OpenType equivalent as well).

CoolType is also available in non-Adobe applications through the commercially licensed Adobe PDF Library.

As with ClearType, Quartz and FreeType, CoolType uses subpixel rendering to effectively triple the usual horizontal resolution of the screen. This makes the text sharper, but the colors might be slightly incorrect at the edges. However, the human eye is better at detecting variations in intensity than in color, and these discrepancies are not usually noticeable.

CoolType also obsoleted the Adobe Type Manager (ATM). Because the font selection menus that CoolType provides display fewer details than ATM, there were some initial problems in editing TeX PostScript output in Adobe applications that used CoolType.

== See also ==
- Subpixel rendering
- Font rasterization
