= Subpixel rendering =

Technique for increasing apparent display resolution

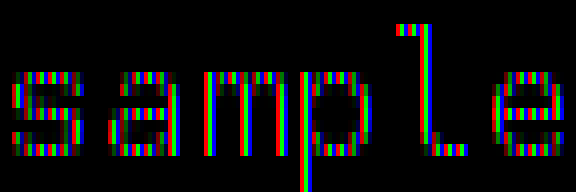
A simulation of subpixel rendering

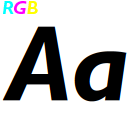
"Aa" rendered in subpixel

The previous image, with the R, G and B channel separated and animated

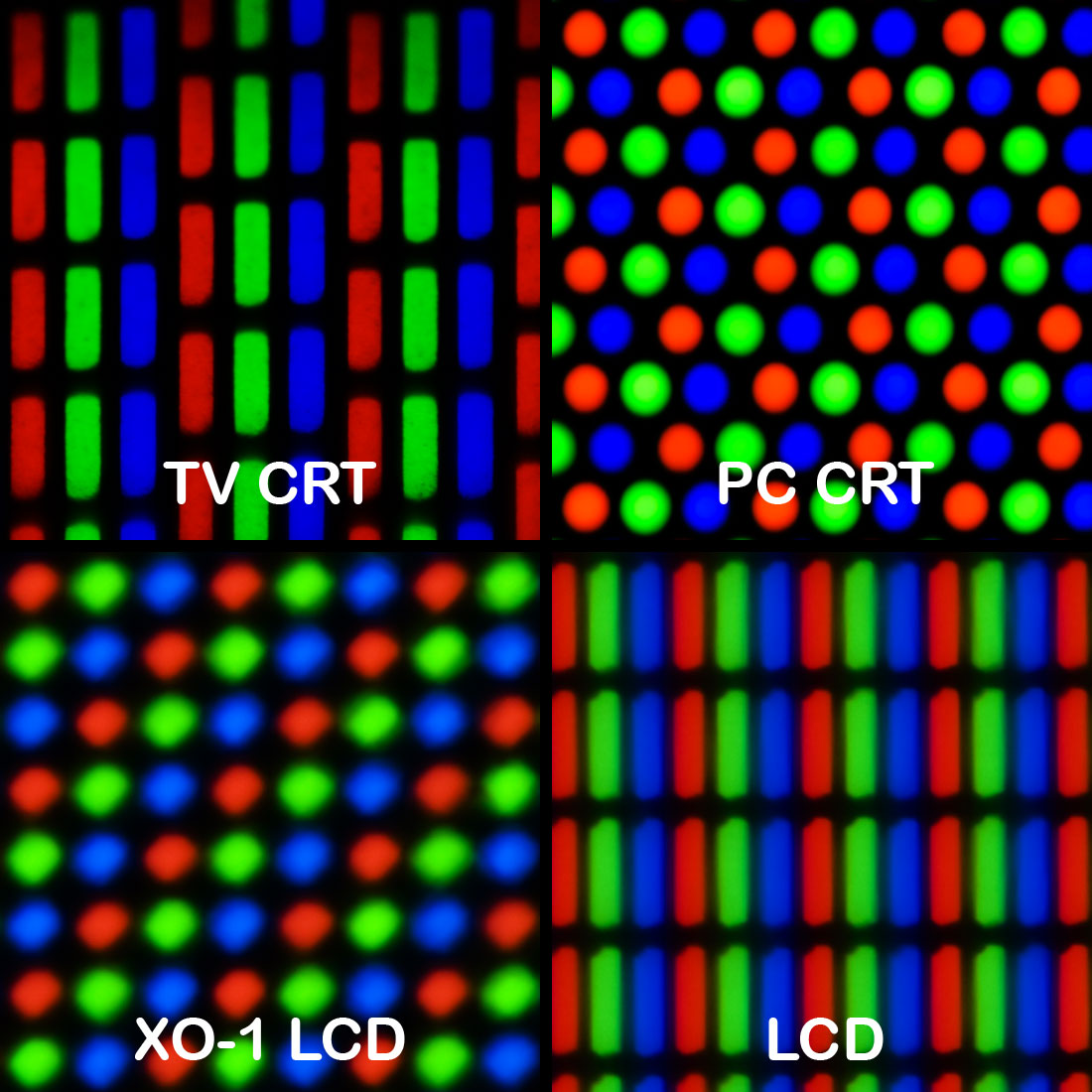
Examples of pixel geometry, showing various arrangements of pixels and subpixels, which must be considered for subpixel rendering. LCD displays consisting of red, green, and blue subpixels (bottom right is the most typical example) are best suited to subpixel rendering.

Subpixel rendering is a method used to increase the effective resolution of a color display device. It utilizes the composition of each pixel, which consists of three subpixels of which are red, green, and blue that can each be individually addressable on the display matrix.

Subpixel rendering is primarily used for text rendering on standard DPI displays.

Despite the inherent color anomalies, it can also be used to render general graphics.

== History ==
The origin of subpixel rendering as used today remains controversial. Apple Inc., IBM, and Microsoft patented various implementations that differed in technical details owing to the different purposes for which their technologies were intended.

Microsoft held several patents in the United States for subpixel rendering technology used in text rendering on RGB Stripe layouts. The patents 6,219,025; 6,239,783; 6,307,566; 6,225,973; 6,243,070; 6,393,145; 6,421,054; 6,282,327; and 6,624,828 were filed between October 7, 1998, and October 7, 1999, and expired on July 30, 2019. Analysis of the patent by FreeType indicates that the patent does not cover the idea of subpixel rendering, but rather the actual filter used as a last step to balance the color. Microsoft's patent describes the smallest possible filter that distributes each subpixel value equally among the R, G, and B pixels. Any other filter will either be blurrier or will introduce color artifacts.

Apple was able to use it in Mac OS X due to a patent cross-licensing agreement.

== Characteristics ==
A single pixel on a color display is made of several subpixels, typically three arranged left-to-right as red, green, and blue (RGB). The components are readily visible with a small magnifying glass, such as a loupe. These pixel components appear as a single color to the human eye because of blurring by optics and spatial integration by nerve cells in the eye. However, the eye is much more sensitive to the location. Therefore, turning on the G and B of one pixel and the R of the next pixel to the right will produce a white dot, but it will appear to be 1/3 of a pixel to the right of the white dot that would be seen from the RGB of only the first pixel. Subpixel rendering leverages this to provide three times the horizontal resolution of the rendered image. However, it has to blur this image to produce the correct color by ensuring the same amount of red, green, and blue are turned on as when no subpixel rendering is being done.

Subpixel rendering does not necessitate the use of antialiasing. It gives a smoother result regardless of whether antialiasing is used or not since it artificially increases the resolution. However, it introduces color aliasing since subpixels are colored. Subsequent filtering applied to remove the color artifacts is a form of antialiasing, although its purpose is not smoothing jagged shapes as in conventional antialiasing.

Subpixel rendering requires the software to know the layout of the subpixels. The most common reason it is wrong is monitors that can be rotated 90 (or 180) degrees, though monitors are manufactured with other arrangements of the subpixels, such as BGR or in triangles, or with 4 colors like RGBW squares. On any such display the result of incorrect subpixel rendering will be worse than if no subpixel rendering was done at all (it will not produce color artifacts, but it will produce noisy edges).

== Implementations ==
=== Apple II ===
Steve Gibson has claimed that the Apple II, introduced in 1977, supports an early form of subpixel rendering in its high-resolution (280×192) graphics mode. The Wozniak patent only used 2 "sub-pixels". The bytes that comprise the Apple II high-resolution screen buffer contain seven visible bits (each corresponding directly to a pixel) and a flag bit used to select between purple/green or blue/orange color sets. Each pixel, since it is represented by a single bit, is either on or off; there are no bits within the pixel itself for specifying color or brightness. Color is instead created as an artifact of the NTSC color encoding scheme, determined by horizontal position: pixels with even horizontal coordinates are always purple (or blue, if the flag bit is set), and odd pixels are always green (or orange). Two lit pixels next to each other are always white, regardless of whether the pair is even/odd or odd/even, and irrespective of the value of the flag bit. This is an approximation, but it is what most programmers of the time would have in mind while working with the Apple's high-resolution mode.

Gibson's example claims that because two adjacent bits form a white block, there are, in fact, two bits per pixel: one that activates the pixel's purple left half and the other that activates its green right half. If the programmer instead activates the green right half of a pixel and the purple left half of the next pixel, the result is a white block 1/2 pixel to the right, which is indeed an instance of subpixel rendering. However, it is not clear whether any programmers of the Apple II have considered the pairs of bits as pixels—instead calling each bit a pixel.

The flag bit in each byte affects color by shifting pixels half a pixel-width to the right. This half-pixel shift was exploited by some graphics software, such as HRCG (High-Resolution Character Generator), an Apple utility that displayed text using the high-resolution graphics mode, to smooth diagonals.

=== ClearType ===
Microsoft announced its subpixel rendering technology, called ClearType, at COMDEX in 1998. Microsoft published a paper in May 2000, Displaced Filtering for Patterned Displays, describing the filtering behind ClearType. It was then made available in Windows XP. Still, it was not activated by default until Windows Vista, while Windows XP OEMs could and did change the default setting.

=== FreeType ===
FreeType, the library used by most current software on the X Window System, contains two open source implementations. The original implementation uses the ClearType antialiasing filters and carries the following notice: "The colour filtering algorithm of Microsoft's ClearType technology for subpixel rendering is covered by patents; for this reason, the corresponding code in FreeType is disabled by default. Note that subpixel rendering per se is prior art; using a different colour filter thus easily circumvents Microsoft's patent claims."

FreeType offers a variety of color filters. Since version 2.6.2, the default filter is light, a filter that is both normalized (value sums up to 1) and color-balanced (eliminate color fringes at the cost of resolution).

Since version 2.8.1, a second implementation exists, called Harmony, that "offers high quality LCD-optimized output without resorting to ClearType techniques of resolution tripling and filtering". This is the method enabled by default. When using this method, "each color channel is generated separately after shifting the glyph outline, capitalizing on the fact that the color grids on LCD panels are shifted by a third of a pixel. This output is indistinguishable from ClearType with a light 3-tap filter." Since the Harmony method does not require additional filtering, it is not covered by the ClearType patents.

=== CoolType ===
Adobe created their own subpixel renderer called CoolType, allowing them to display documents the same way across various operating systems: Windows, MacOS, Linux etc. When it was launched around the year 2001, CoolType supported a wider range of fonts than Microsoft's ClearType, which at the time was limited to TrueType fonts. In contrast, Adobe's CoolType also supported PostScript fonts (and their OpenType equivalents).

=== macOS ===
Mac OS X (later OS X, now macOS) also used subpixel rendering, as part of Quartz 2D. However, it was removed after the introduction of Retina displays. Unlike Microsoft's implementation, which favors a tight fit to the grid (font hinting) to maximize legibility, Apple's implementation prioritizes the shape of the glyphs as set out by their designer.

== See also ==
- Font rasterization – Process of converting text from vector to raster
- Kell factor – Parameter in image signal processing
- PenTile matrix family – Electronic device display
- Sub-pixel resolution – Graphical quality
- Dithering
