= Font management software =

Utility software

Font management software is a kind of utility software that computer users use to browse and preview fonts and typically to install and uninstall fonts. Some font management software may be able to also:

- activate and deactivate fonts (users can do this manually; sometimes programs will do this in conjunction with specific software)
- protect fonts that are required by the system by preventing them from being uninstalled
- organize fonts by groups and libraries
- find and uninstall corrupt fonts
- rename font files
- view fonts that are not currently installed
- print font samples or font books illustrating some or all of the fonts on the system
- sort fonts according to different criteria
- search for fonts meeting specific criteria

== Objectives ==
Font management software generally possesses more font management capabilities than most operating systems.

=== Finding and Evaluating Fonts ===
Font management software allows its users to catalogue and inspect fonts on their system. Font management software allows its users to view a font in multiple ways.

Users can inspect the font in more detail, such as looking at the fonts glyphs, or comparing another font.

Font management software may also provide detail on the glyph count of a font, if the font can be embedded (such as in a PDF), or the creator of the font.

=== System Stability ===
Font management software may be able to activate or deactivate fonts depending on when they are needed. This reduces the load on the system to keep many font active at the same time.

Some font management programs can activate fonts or a specific group of fonts when a program or document launched. When the program or document is closed, the font management software can deactivate the same fonts. This method of activating fonts can activate fonts on the fly (such as during a specific project), reducing the load on the system.

Linux-based operating systems generally do not pre-load fonts on a system-wide basis. Instead, each application loads them as it needs them. Current Linux desktop environments (such as KDE and Gnome) manage fonts for applications using their internal framework library calls for font display, allowing management of fonts via the GUI.

== List of font management software ==
Note: Information on supported fonts is not readily available from many manufacturers. However, most of the major commercial programs support OpenType and TrueType fonts.

Name	Operating system	License	Author	Publisher	Supported fonts	Notes
BDF Font Viewer	Windows	Freeware	Komeil Bahmanpour	Chortkeh		
Connect	MacOS, Windows	Proprietary		Extensis	OpenType TT (OTF or TTF), OpenType PS (OTF), PostScript CID, Multiple Master (MM), TrueType, TTC, Apple Advanced Typography (AAT), Datafork TrueType (dfont), Color Fonts. Syncs with Google Fonts and Adobe Fonts	Classic desktop font manager with additional web-based tools for remote access and font suggestions.
DiskFonts	Mac OS, Windows	Proprietary		Anastasiy	Bitmap, OpenType, TrueType	Font manager panel for Adobe Creative Suite (CS3, CS4, CS5), supports FontExpert groups
dp4 Font Viewer	Windows	Freeware	Stephan Deutsch	Digital Performance	OpenType (OTF), TrueType (TTF)	Portable font manager and viewer, with advanced search and filtering capabilities.
Elara Online Font Manager	Mac OS, Windows, Linux, BSDs and others	Proprietary		Everything Fonts	TrueType, OpenType, Woff and many other formats	Works directly from the browser. No local install necessary.
FontBase	Mac OS, Windows, Linux	Freeware		Dominik Levitsky Studio	OpenType, TrueType	
FontAgent Server	Mac OS, Windows	Proprietary		Insider Software	OpenType, TrueType	
FontExpert	Windows	Proprietary		Proxima Software	OpenType, TrueType, TTC, WOFF (preview and create), Bitmap and vector (*.fon)	
Font Explorer X Pro	Mac OS, Windows	Proprietary		Linotype/Monotype		
Font-Manager	Linux, BSDs	GNU General Public License	Jerry Casiano	font-manager project		programmed in Vala, depends on GTK+ 3
Fontmatrix	Mac OS, Windows, Linux and BSDs	GNU General Public License	Pierre Marchand	Hosted on GitHub	OpenType, TrueType	programmed in C++, depends on Qt
MainType Free Edition	Windows	Free		High-Logic	OpenType TT (OTF or TTF), OpenType PS (OTF), PostScript CID, TrueType, TTC, Color Fonts, Variable Fonts	The free edition supports up to 2500 fonts in your font library and can only be used by a non-commercial entity for personal, educational and non-commercial use.
MainType	Windows	Proprietary		High-Logic	OpenType TT (OTF or TTF), OpenType PS (OTF), PostScript CID, TrueType, TTC, Color Fonts, Variable Fonts	
NexusFont	Windows	Free	Noh JungHoon	Xiles	OpenType, TrueType,	
RightFont	Mac OS	Proprietary		Markly Team		
Suitcase Fusion	Mac OS, Windows	Proprietary		Extensis	OpenType TT (OTF or TTF), OpenType PS (OTF), PostScript CID, Multiple Master (MM), TrueType, TTC, Apple Advanced Typography (AAT), Datafork TrueType (dfont), Color Fonts	Fully-featured font manager. OS support and partner application support info Was previously merged with Font Reserve. Evolved into Connect Fonts.
Suitcase TeamSync	Mac OS, Windows	Proprietary		Extensis	Same as Suitcase Fusion	Cloud-based font server that serves as an optional central backend for Suitcase Fusion. Evolved into Connect Fonts.
Typeface	Mac OS	Proprietary	Floor van Steeg	By Default	OpenType, TrueType, WOFF, TTC, Datafork TrueType (dfont), PostScript CID, Color Fonts, Variable Fonts	Native local font manager for macOS. Syncs with Google Fonts.
Universal Type Server	Mac OS, Windows	Proprietary		Extensis	Same as Suitcase Fusion	On-site/local font server that serves as an optional central backend for Suitcase Fusion. Server OS support and compatibility Client OS support and compatibility
X-Fonter	Windows	Proprietary		Blacksun Software	Truetype, OpenType, PostScript Type 1, raster, vector	

== Discontinued font management software ==
Note: Information on supported fonts is not readily available from many manufacturers. However, most of the major commercial programs support OpenType and TrueType fonts.

Name	Operating system	License	Author	Publisher	Supported fonts	Notes
Adobe Type Manager Light (ATM Light)	Mac OS 8.6 through 9.1, Mac OS X Classic; Windows 95, 98, NT 4.0 with Service Pack 4	Free		Adobe Systems		Discontinued: ATM Deluxe and ATM Light were discontinued in 2005.
Advanced Font Viewer	Windows	Proprietary		Styopkin Software		
AMP Font Viewer	Windows	Free		AMPsoft	OpenType, PostScript Type 1, TrueType	
California Fonts	Windows	Free		The Scone Company, LLC	OpenType, Postscript Type 1, TrueType	Discontinued: Blocked by Win 10.
Font Card	Mac OS 10.4 (but not Mac OS X 10.6 Leopard)	Proprietary		Unsanity	OpenType, PostScript, TrueType	Discontinued: Website no longer active. Modifies the Font menu and the font panel in Carbon and Cocoa applications. Supports FontAgent Pro, FontExplorer X, and Suitcase Fusion font sets.
Fontcase	Mac OS X	Proprietary		Bohemian Coding		Discontinued: Fontcase was discontinued in November 2013. Bohemian Coding currently develops UX design app Sketch
FontDrop	Mac, Windows	Proprietary	Ramon Mendes	MI Software	*.ttf, *.otf	Discontinued: Website points to spam site. Allows to drag'n'drop fonts directly to Sketch or Photoshop creating a new text layer
Font Fitting Room Deluxe	Windows	Proprietary		Qweas	Microsoft Windows (*.fnt, *.fon), OpenType (*.ttf, *.ttc, *.otf), PostScript Type 1 (*.pfm, *.pfb), TrueType (*.ttf, *.ttc)	Last release date in 2013 (as of April 2022)
Font Frenzy	Windows	Free	Timothy Williams (computer programmer)	SDSoftware		Last updated in 2010
Font Manager	Windows	Proprietary		Styopkin Software		Website offline, last update in 2010
Font Pilot	OS X	Proprietary		Koingo Software		Discontinued in 2008
FontRainbow	Windows	Proprietary	Tony Wicks	Everclear Systems	MS TrueType / TT Collections, MS OpenType, Adobe Type 1, Adobe OpenType	Discontinued: Website active but screenshots are from Windows Vista. The first program to use Everclear System's "Rainbow Interface"
Font Safari	Mac OS 9+	Proprietary		Dreystone Software		Last updated in 2006
Font Wrangler	Windows	Shareware/bookware		Alchemy Mindworks	TrueType	Does not support Windows 12
Font Xplorer	Windows	Free	Ahto Tanner	Moon Software	TrueType, OpenType (only those with TrueType outlines)	Discontinued: No mention of Font Xplorer on developer website. Does not support Adobe Type 1 fonts or OpenType fonts with PostScript outlines.
Free & Easy Font Viewer	Windows	Free		Styopkin Software		Only views characters A-I, a-i, 0-9 and basic punctuation of installed fonts. See Advanced Font Viewer for improved features.
gnome-specimen	Linux, BSDs	GNU General Public License		gnome-specimen	OpenType, PostScript Type 1, raster, TrueType, vector	Package removed from Debian in 2018
MasterJuggler	OS X	Proprietary		AlSoft	Outline, OpenType, PostScript, printer, screen, TrueType	Discontinued
The Font Thing	Windows	Free	Sue Fisher	Sue Fisher	TrueType	A legacy font management program; has not been updated since 1999, though apparently is still popular among some users
Typograf	Windows	Proprietary	Alex Neuber	Neuber Software GmbH	Truetype, OpenType, PostScript Type 1, printer, raster, vector	Only supports Windows up to Windows 10 https://www.neuber.com/typograph/
Opcion Font Viewer	Java	Free	P. Chiu	Opcion		Last update: 08.2007. Windows .exe installer may not work with current versions of Java (above 1.5.9).
Printer's Apprentice	Windows	Proprietary	Bryan T. Kinkel	Lose Your Mind Development	OpenType, PostScript, TrueType	Last update, 1/25/2017 – Supports Windows 10
