= Fontmatrix =

Font manager for Linux desktop environments

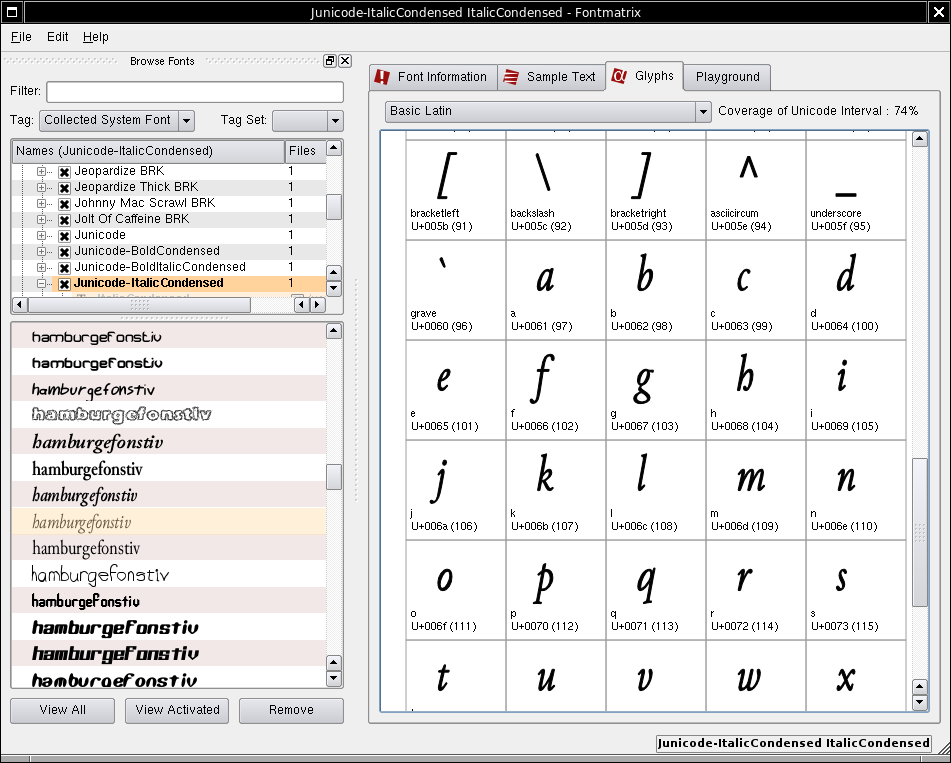
- Developer: Pierre Marchand
- Release: 2007; 19 years ago
- Stable release: 1.0.1 / September 29, 2026; 29 days ago
- Written in: C++
- Operating system: Linux, Windows
- Platform: x86-64
- Available in: English
- Type: Font management software
- License: GPL-2.0 license
- Website: fontmatrix.l10n-bg.dev
- Repository: github.com/fontmatrix/fontmatrix

Fontmatrix is a font manager for Linux desktop environments. It can manage fonts installed system-wide or for individual user accounts. It relies on FreeType to render font samples, and on Qt for its user interface. Bruce Byfield hailed the creation of Fontmatrix with an article concluding with: "Finally, the long wait for a GNU/Linux font manager is ending."

Fontmatrix lets users label a font with multiple tags (similar to Gmail labels), which may be activated or deactivated as sets. It also allows the user to toggle features of OpenType fonts for testing purposes. As of November 2008, the PANOSE classification present in fonts may also be used to select them by similarity.

== See also ==
- Font management software
