= Raymond D. Kell =

American television researcher (1904–1986)

Raymond Davis Kell (June 7, 1904 – November 2, 1986), most often known as Ray Kell, was an American television researcher at RCA. He was awarded the Stuart Ballantine Medal in 1948 for being a pioneer in the development of color television.

Kell was born on June 7, 1904, in Kell, Illinois, and received his B.S. degree in electrical engineering from the University of Illinois in 1926. From 1927 to 1930 he was engaged in television research in the radio consulting laboratory of General Electric. From 1930 to 1941 he worked in the research division of the RCA Manufacturing Company, and from 1941 he was with the RCA Laboratories Division. He received a "Modern Pioneer" award from the National Association of Manufacturers in February 1940 for inventions in television. Kell died in Mesa, Arizona on November 2, 1986, at the age of 82.

== See also ==
- Kell factor
- George H. Brown
