= Komeil Bahmanpour =

Iranian businessman

Komeil Bahmanpour کمیل بهمن‌پور
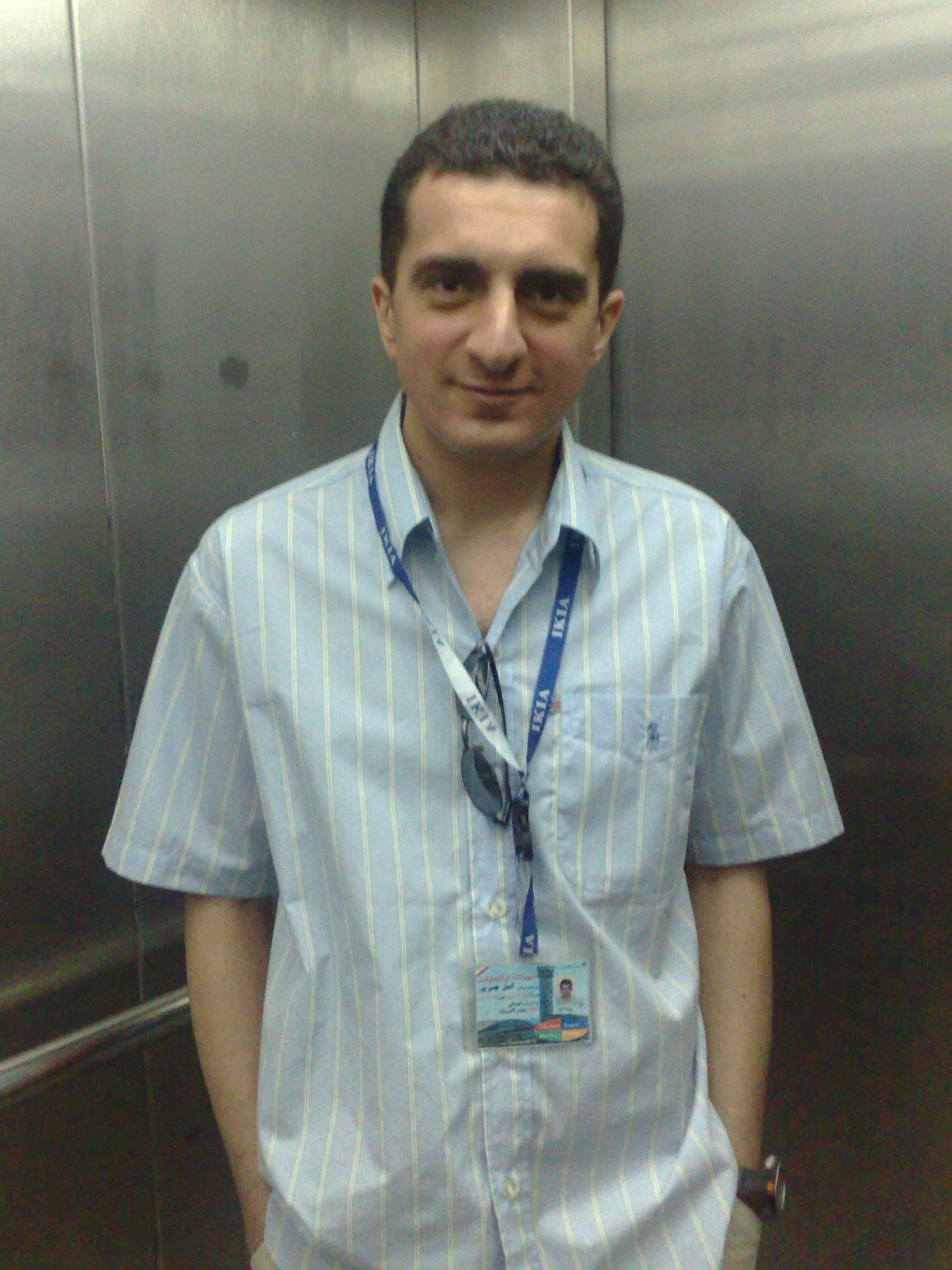
- Komeil Bahmanpour at the IKA in Tehran, June 2009
- Born: January 28, 1978 (age 48); Tehran, Iran
- Occupations: Entrepreneur; software architect; author
- Years active: 1992–present
- Known for: Co-founding Chortkeh, contributing to the Unicode Standard
- Awards: Best World/Farsi Editor, 2004 ODP Autumn Editor Awards
- Website: www.komeil.com

Komeil Bahmanpour (born January 28, 1978) is an Iranian entrepreneur, software architect and author. He is a co-founder and the president of Chortkeh.

== Early life and education ==
Komeil Bahmanpour was born and raised in Tehran, Iran. Thanks to his father being an influential banker, he grew up learning about IBM mainframes at Tejarat Bank Bureau of Informatics. Starting his profession as a teenager in 1992, he studied computer programming in IUST and obtained his IBM mainframe Assembly programming license. He has also studied software engineering at Azad South Tehran University of Technology.

== Career ==
In 1999, Komeil Bahmanpour was introduced to an American electronic forms software company willing to open overseas subsidiaries for the purpose of Middle Eastern software development and marketing. The deal went on and Chortkeh (Persian: چرتکه)—back then doing business as Chortkeh Rayaneh Hamrah, LLC (Persian: چرتکه رایانه همراه، شرکت با مسئولیت محدود)—was established.

=== Chortkeh ===
He was assigned as the chief software architect also managing development teams working on projects in different fields such as document conversion into electronic forms, virtual printer, object recognition, barcode, etc.

=== Open Directory Project ===
Between 2003 and 2007, Komeil Bahmanpour was an editor at Netscape's ODP, also maintaining an unaffiliated site in Persian portal at Dmoz.ir.

He won the Best World/Farsi Editor at the 2004 ODP Autumn Editor Awards.

Bahmanpour was involved in a decision to change the URL of the Persian ODP from Dmoz.org/World/Farsi/ into Dmoz.org/World/Persian/.

=== Unicode contribution ===
Multilingual software and fonts have always been his main interests. He has contributed to the development of the Unicode Standard, especially in Arabic, Persian and Hebrew languages. He also authored Chortkeh Font Toolbox, a font management software suite comprising the freeware Chortkeh BDF Font Viewer since January 19, 2002.
