= Resel =

In image analysis, a resel (from resolution element) represents the actual spatial resolution in an image or a volumetric dataset. The number of resels in the image may be lower or equal to the number of pixel/voxels in the image. In an actual image the resels can vary across the image and indeed the local resolution can be expressed as "resels per pixel" (or "resels per voxel").

In functional neuroimaging analysis, an estimate of the number of resels together with random field theory is used in statistical inference. Keith Worsley has proposed an estimate for the number of resels/roughness.

The word "resel" is related to the words "pixel", "texel", and "voxel". Waldo R. Tobler is probably among the first to use the word.

== See also ==
- Kell factor
- Full width at half maximum

== Bibliography ==
- Keith J. Worsley, An unbiased estimator for the roughness of a multivariate Gaussian random field, Technical report, 2000 July.
- Keith J. Worsley, Alan C. Evans, S. Marrett, P. Neelin (1992). "A Three-Dimensional Statistical Analysis for CBF Activation Studies in Human Brain". Journal of Cerebral Blood Flow and Metabolism. 12 (6): 900–918. doi:10.1038/jcbfm.1992.127. PMID 1400644. S2CID 6646106. Archived from the original on 2011-05-18.
- Waldo R. Tobler, S. Kennedy (July 1985). "Smooth multidimensional interpolation". Geographical Analysis. 17 (3): 251–257. Bibcode:1985GeoAn..17..251T. doi:10.1111/j.1538-4632.1985.tb00846.x.
