= Pixel geometry =

Arrangement of color elements in an image sensor or display

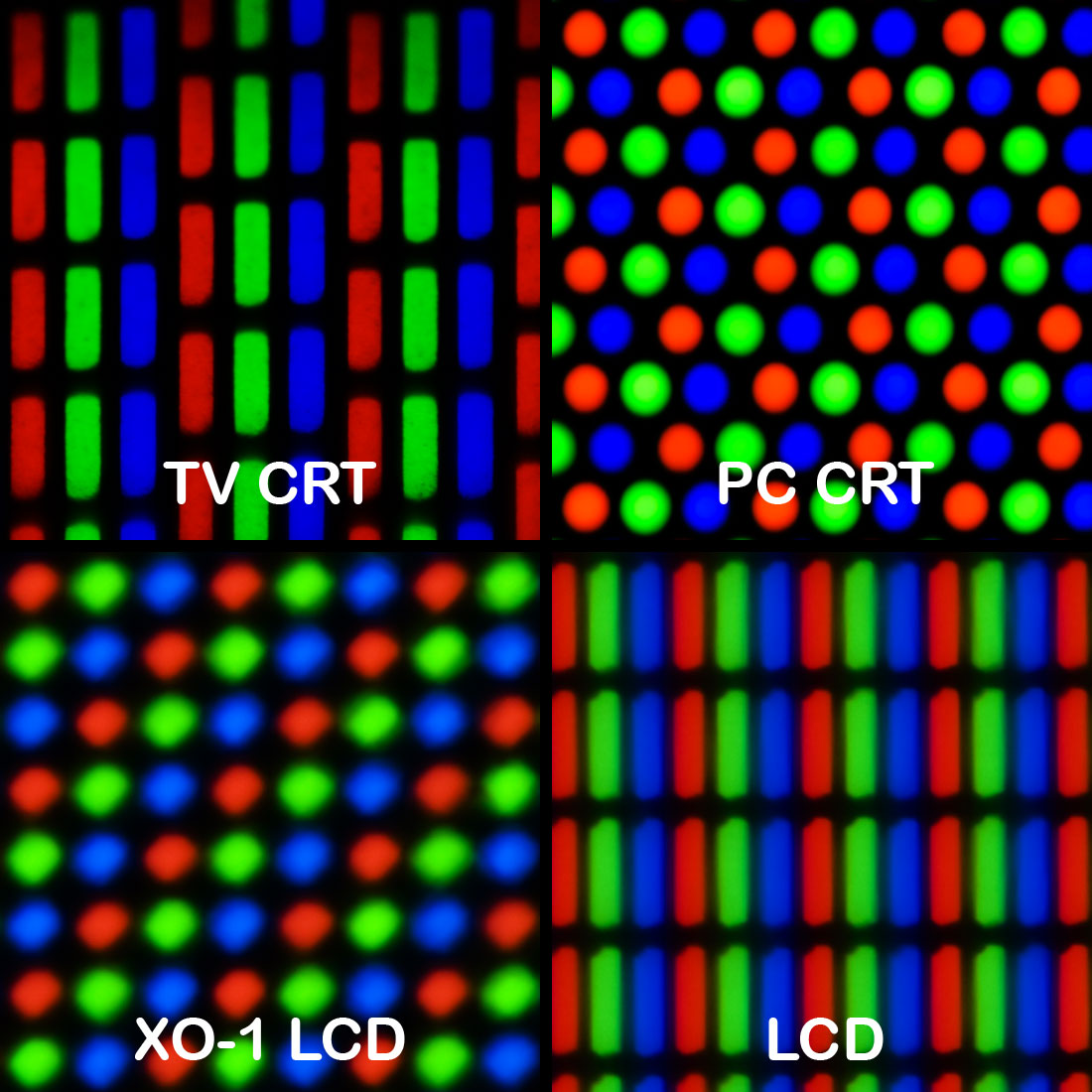
Photographs of various displays, showing various pixel geometries. Clockwise from top left, a standard definition CRT television, a CRT computer monitor, a laptop LCD, and the OLPC XO-1 LCD.

The components of the pixels (primary colors red, green and blue) in an image sensor or display can be ordered in different patterns, called pixel geometry.

The geometric arrangement of the primary colors within a pixel varies depending on usage (see figure 1). In monitors, such as LCDs or CRTs, that typically display edges or rectangles, the components are arranged in vertical stripes.

Knowledge of the pixel geometry used by a display may be used to create raster images of higher apparent resolution using subpixel rendering.

== Function ==
=== Subpixel rendering ===
A single pixel on a colour display is made of several subpixels, typically three arranged left-to-right as red, green, and blue (RGB). These pixel components appear as a single colour to the human eye because of blurring by optics and spatial integration by nerve cells in the eye - for example, a pixel made up of red, green and blue subpixels will register as white at a distance. However, the eye is much more sensitive to the location. Therefore, turning on the G and B of one pixel and the R of the next pixel to the right will produce a white dot, but it will appear to be 1/3 of a pixel to the right of the white dot that would be seen from the RGB of only the first pixel. Subpixel rendering takes advantage of this to provide three times the horizontal resolution of the rendered image, though it has to blur this image to produce the correct color by ensuring the same amount of red, green, and blue are turned on as when no subpixel rendering is being done.

Subpixel rendering does not necessitate the use of antialiasing, and gives a smoother result regardless of whether antialiasing is used or not since it artificially increases the resolution. However, it introduces colour aliasing since subpixels are coloured. Subsequent filtering applied to remove the colour artifacts is a form of antialiasing, although its purpose is not smoothing jagged shapes as in conventional antialiasing.

Subpixel rendering requires the software to know the layout of the subpixels. The most common reason it is wrong is monitors that can be rotated 90 (or 180) degrees, though monitors are manufactured with other arrangements of the subpixels, such as BGR or in triangles, or with 4 colours like RGBW squares. On any such display the result of incorrect subpixel rendering will be worse than if no subpixel rendering was done at all (it will not produce color artifacts, but it will produce noisy edges).

=== Resampling ===
Depending on the type of screen, there is a different correspondence between the number of pixels and the number of subpixels. As an example, a triangular display, as is used in some TV CRT models, has unaligned subpixels, meaning each scan of the screen lighting up all pixels underneath it will not light up all the pixels on the screen. Displays of motion pictures tend to have diagonal displays to give the viewer a better idea of the image variation. Though on a triangular grid a set of subpixels is technically a "pixel", it is not typically understood as such as they are not in a rectangular grid.

== Types ==
Triangular (Delta)

Stripes

Diagonal

=== List ===
Type	Image	Description
RGB		Aligned RGB pixels
RGB (Alternating)		
RGB Chevron		Aligned RGB pixels in chevron shapes
XO		
Horizontal column dot		
Pentile		Twice as many green subpixels as red and blue, and image pixels map onto only two subpixels each.

== See also ==
- PenTile matrix family
- Quattron
- Bayer filter
- Subpixel rendering
- Pixel
