= Adobe Type Manager =

Computer program for managing fonts

Adobe Type Manager (ATM) was a family of computer programs created and marketed by Adobe Systems for use with their PostScript Type 1 fonts. The last release was Adobe ATM Light 4.1.2, per Adobe's FTP (at the time).

Around 2000, with Apple's Mac OS X and Windows 2000, support for both Type 1 fonts and OpenType fonts with PostScript outlines was built into the operating system using ATM Light code contributed by Adobe. As a result, ATM was then no longer necessary for font imaging or printing.

== Apple Macintosh ==
The original ATM was created for the Apple Macintosh computer platform to scale PostScript Type 1 fonts for the computer monitor, and for printing to non-PostScript printers. Mac Type 1 fonts come with screen fonts set to display at certain point sizes only. In Macintosh operating systems prior to Mac OS X, Type 1 fonts set at other sizes would appear jagged on the monitor. ATM allowed Type 1 fonts to appear smooth at any point size, and to print well to non-PostScript devices.

Around 1996, Adobe expanded ATM into a font-management program called ATM Deluxe; the original ATM was renamed ATM Light. ATM Deluxe performed the same font-smoothing function as ATM Light, but performed a variety of other functions: activation and deactivation of fonts; creating sets of fonts that could be activated or deactivated simultaneously; viewing and printing font samples; and scanning for duplicate fonts, font format conflicts, and PostScript fonts missing screen or printer files.

Adobe discontinued development of ATM Deluxe for Macintosh after Apple moved to Mac OS X. Adobe ceased selling ATM Deluxe in 2005. ATM Deluxe does not work reliably under OS X (even under Classic), however, ATM Light is still helpful to Type 1 font users under Classic.

== Microsoft Windows ==
Adobe ported these products to the Microsoft Windows operating system platform, where they managed font display by patching into Windows (3.0, 3.1x, 95, 98, Me) at a very low level. The design of Windows NT made this kind of patching unviable, and Microsoft initially responded by allowing Type 1 fonts to be converted to TrueType on install, but in Windows NT 4.0, Microsoft added "font driver" support to allow ATM to provide Type 1 support (and in theory other font drivers for other types).

As with ATM Light for Macintosh, Adobe licensed to Microsoft the core code, which was integrated into Windows 2000 and Windows XP, making ATM Light for Windows obsolete, except for the special case of support for "multiple master" fonts, which Microsoft did not include in Windows, and for which ATM Lite still acts as a font driver.

Although it has been discontinued in 2005, ATM Light is still available for Windows users, but ATM Deluxe is no longer developed or sold.

Users of ATM 4.0 (Light or Deluxe) on Windows 95/98/ME who upgrade to Windows 2000/XP may encounter problems, and it is vital not to install version 4.0 into Windows 2000 or later; affected users are encouraged to visit the Adobe web site for technical information and patches. Version 4.1.2 is fully compatible with Windows 2000 and XP (It will run on XP 64-bit, but because the installer doesn't work it must be first installed on 32-bit XP and then copied over to 64-bit XP).

ATM installed on XP may prevent a system from entering standby – the error message indicates keyboard driver needs updating. Uninstalling ATM corrects the issue.

Windows Vista is incompatible with both ATM Light and ATM Deluxe. Windows Vista can use Adobe Type 1 fonts natively, making add-ons like ATM unnecessary.

The latest version of ATM for Windows 3.1 is 3.02. There was no ATM Deluxe for Windows versions prior to 95.

Acrobat Reader, starting with version 2.1, installs a version of ATM for its own use, referred to as a Portable Font Server, but there is no control panel or other user interface for it. It is therefore unsuitable for the tasks which most people need to install ATM for.

== Other operating systems ==
Adobe Type Manager was also made available for a select few PC operating systems available during the early 1990s, including NeXTSTEP, DESQview, and OS/2. Unlike the Windows and Mac versions, these versions of ATM were bundled with the OS itself.

There were also ATM versions for extremely popular DOS applications, the most notable being WordPerfect 5.0 and 5.1. This incarnation of ATM, made by LaserTools was named PrimeType in the United States and Adobe Type Manager for WordPerfect elsewhere. An alternative to ATM for WordPerfect 5.1 was infiniType Plus by SoftMaker. WordPerfect 6.0 and newer included its own Type 1 system, making third-party solutions obsolete.

== Competing products ==
- Bitstream FaceLift
- Bohemian Coding FontCase
- Extensis Suitcase Fusion
- Linotype FontExplorer X
- SoftMaker infiniType
