= High-Logic =

Private company in the Netherlands

- Type: Private
- Industry: Software
- Founded: 1997
- Founder: Erwin Denissen
- Headquarters: De Bilt, Netherlands
- Products: FontCreator; MainType; Scanahand

High-Logic is a Dutch software company founded in 1997 by Erwin Denissen. The company develops font editing and font management software, including FontCreator and MainType. The company headquarters is in De Bilt, the Netherlands.

== Products ==
=== FontCreator ===
The company's flagship product is FontCreator (formerly known as Font Creator Program) for Microsoft Windows. FontCreator is a font editor that allows users to create and modify fonts using vector-based tools.

=== MainType ===
High-Logic released MainType, a font-management program for Windows, on December 2, 2005. It includes tools for installing, organizing, and previewing fonts.

=== Scanahand ===
On April 23, 2008, High-Logic released Scanahand, a font generator for Windows that allows the user to print out a form, manually fill in the glyphs, scan it into the program, and generate new fonts. The most recent version, Scanahand 7.0, was released in January 2020 and last updated in July 2020.
