= System suitcase =

The System suitcase (so-called because its icon depicts a suitcase; officially called the System file) is one of two essential files that make up the classic Mac OS, the other being the Macintosh Finder. If either file is missing or corrupted, a Macintosh may display a blinking question mark when booting. The suitcase is located in the System Folder, like the Finder file, and contains keyboard layouts, FKEY resources, cursors, icons, sounds, and, in System 6, bitmap fonts, and desk accessories. Mac OS only supports one System file; the presence of more than one System file on a hard disk is likely to cause system instability.

== History ==
=== System 1 through 6 ===
In versions released up to and including System 6, the System file could not be opened by the Finder. Files could only be moved into or out of the System file using Apple's built-in Font/DA Mover tool. A large System file could cause system instability and could easily become corrupt, requiring users to wipe and rebuild it.

=== System 7 and later ===
In System 7 and subsequent releases, Apple moved several components of the System file to other locations, to reduce the file's bloat and improve stability. In System 7, desk accessories were turned into normal applications that could be placed anywhere on the hard disk, though their default location is a new "Apple Menu Items". System 7's Finder gained the ability to open and modify the System file as if it were a normal folder. Users could double click on fonts or sounds contained in the System file to preview them. Sounds, keyboard layouts and fonts could be added to the System file through drag and drop. System 7 also gained the ability to install bitmapped or TrueType fonts by dragging and dropping them onto the System Folder, which would move them to the System file. Font/DA Mover was removed in System 7, as it was no longer needed.

System 7.1 moved fonts from the System suitcase to a new Fonts folder within the System folder. From then on, fonts could be installed by moving them to the Fonts subfolder, though they would only become available to applications after the applications were restarted.

== Third-party tools ==
Several third-party apps were created to manage the System suitcase. Symantec's Suitcase was the "industry standard" for managing fonts. ALsoft's Master Juggler could also manage Fkeys, items in the Apple menu, and system sounds.

== Easter eggs ==
In System 6, the string "Help! Help! We're being held prisoner in a system software factory!" appears in the data fork of the System file. During System 7 development, it was updated to "Help! Help! We're still being held prisoner in a system software factory!". Later versions of System 7 contain other variations of the message. A list of credits also follows in each case.
