= SFNT =

Font file format

- Filename extension: .ttf .otf
- Internet media type: font/sfnt; application/font-sfnt (deprecated)

SFNT is a font file format which can contain other fonts, such as PostScript, TrueType, OpenType, Web Open Font Format (WOFF) fonts. SFNT stands for spline font or scalable font, and was originally developed for TrueType fonts on the Macintosh and used by Apple Computer's QuickDraw. SFNT was named after the resource tag the Macintosh used internally to track font data.

Many existing font formats are based on the table-based SFNT format, such as TrueType, OpenType and Open Font Format, Web Open Font Format (WOFF), SIL Graphite and many others.

SFNT is flexible, extensible and offers an opportunity to introduce additional table structures when needed, in a way that would not affect existing font rendering engines and text layout implementations. However, due to the limitation of SFNT system, a maximum number of 16^{4} = 65536 characters can be put in one font table. This limitation is partially overcome in the derived formats using "OpenType Collections", formerly known as "TrueType collections", so that a file can contain multiple fonts with up to 65536 characters.

== See also ==
- Web typography
