= Unified Font Object =

XML-based source file format for digital fonts

Unified Font Object (UFO)
- Filename extension: .ufo, .ufoz
- Developed by: Tal Leming, Just van Rossum, Erik van Blokland, Ben Kiel, Frederik Berlaen
- Initial release: UFO 1
- Latest release: UFO 3
- Type of format: macOS Package, XML, Property List
- Free format?: Yes
- Website: https://unifiedfontobject.org

The Unified Font Object (UFO) is an XML-based source file format for digital fonts. It was created by Tal Leming, Just van Rossum and Erik van Blokland. Contributors to the format also include Ben Kiel and Frederik Berlaen. According to its creators, the UFO is a "future proof" open format that is designed to be "application independent", "human readable and human editable".

== History ==
The first version of the UFO format was created in 2003. The most recent version, UFO 3, was released in 2012.

=== RoboFog (1996–2003) ===
The idea for the Unified Font Object originated with a customized version of the font editor Fontographer 3.5. Petr van Blokland, together with Just van Rossum and Erik van Blokland, and with assistance from David Berlow and Steven Paul of the Font Bureau, created and distributed on a subscription basis a customized version of Fontographer called RoboFog in 1996. RoboFog allowed users to script in Python, a language Just's brother Guido van Rossum invented two years prior in 1994. The tool became very popular among type designers because of the ability to automate tasks.

In 1998, FontLab, rival font editor developer to Fontographer (then owned by Macromedia) added Python to version 2.0 of their application, partially due to the popularity of RoboFog. On March 24, 2001, Apple released Mac OS X 10.0, a major rewrite of the Mac operating system. Fontographer was by then too old to be ported to Mac OS X, so the RoboFog developers turned their attention to FontLab.

=== RoboFab and the creation of UFO (2003–2009) ===
In February, 2003, at the TypoTechnica conference in Heidelberg, van Rossum, van Blokland and Baltimore-based type designer Tal Leming combined their existing FontLab API scripts into a Python module called RoboFab. The group started going by the name "The RoboFab Consortium". With RoboFab came a need for an interchange file format for transferring font data between RoboFog and FontLab. In April, 2003, van Rossum started work on an XML-based file format for glyph data called the Glyph Interchange Format (GLIF). In July, 2003, the group started work on the first UFO file format (later known as "UFO 1"), which used "GLIF for glyph information and Apple's .plist (also XML based and entirely cross platform) for any other data as listings, indices, etc." The group intended to present it at the 2003 RoboThon conference, but its launch was delayed until March 14, 2004.

The group introduced the UFO with the following manifesto:

1. The data must be human readable and human editable.
2. The data should be application independent.
3. Data duplication should be avoided unless absolutely necessary.

In the consortium's view, font data should be independent of font editors to avoid issues like Software rot, which the field of type design is particularly prone to, due to the long period of time that fonts take to develop and the relative lack of variety in font editing applications.

=== Decentralization (2009–Present) ===
In 2009, UFO version 2 was announced at RoboThon 2009, bringing minor changes to the format. A variety of applications outside of FontLab using the UFO format started to be written at around this time, such as Leming's kerning application MetricsMachine, van Blokland's interpolation application, Superpolator, and Frederik Berlaen's parametric design application, KalliCulator.

At the request of David Berlow and Petr van Blokland, Frederik Berlaen started work in 2009 on a font editor that used the UFO as a native format. Because of the network of apps now being used in the "UFO workflow", "the dependency of FontLab as a central drawing environment had created a bottleneck", in their view. Berlaen presented his font editor RoboFont at ATypI 2011 in Reykjavík, and gave it the tagline, "The missing UFO font editor".

At RoboThon 2012, UFO 3 was announced, and Tal Leming was named “Benevolent Dictator for life” of the UFO format. Major changes to the UFO include a reworking of how the format organizes design layers, and an introduction of a ZIP-compressed "UFOZ" format.

Shortly thereafter, other font editing programs, such as Glyphs, FontLab and FontForge started supporting the UFO as an interchange format.

The fourth version of the format, "UFO 4", is currently in the concept phase.

== Technical format ==
The UFO is a package; a file system directory that presents as a single file on MacOS. On Windows and other operating systems without support for packages, it appears as a normal file system directory with the extension ".ufo".

UFOs are organized with XML-based Property List files in the main UFO file system directory, describing font-wide metadata, like font name and weight, as well as interactions between glyphs, like glyph groups and kerning.

Files containing glyph outline data are contained in a directory one level down, one file per glyph. These files end in ".glif", and are in an XML-based format called "Glyph Interchange Format (GLIF)". GLIF files can describe glyph Bézier curves in cubic or quadratic formats.

OpenType features in AFDKO feature syntax are stored in a plain text file in the main UFO file system directory, with the filename extension ".fea".

=== Criticism ===
A common criticism of the format is that its structure (of sometimes hundreds of GLIF files) does not work well with online file hosting services like Dropbox. This criticism led to the proposal and adoption of the "UFOZ" format, which is a UFO (version 3 and up) compressed into a ZIP archive.

Another criticism of the UFO is that there is no normalized form, as the order of elements in its files and indent standards are left up to the editor. This led to the creation of a few "UFO Normalizers", like the "psfnormalize" command in SIL International's "pysilfont" project, and the "ufonormalizer" project by Tal Leming.

== Use in applications ==
The following are some applications that support the UFO format either natively or as an officially-supported interchange format.

Application Name	Kind of Application	Platform	License
Area51	UFO Viewer, feature editor	macOS	Proprietary
FontCreator	Multipurpose font editor	Windows	Proprietary
FontForge	Multipurpose font editor	Linux, Windows, macOS (through X11)	Mix of GNU General Public License v3 and BSD license
FontLab	Multipurpose font editor	Windows, macOS	Proprietary
Fontra	Multipurpose font editor	Linux, Windows, macOS	GNU General Public License v3
Glyphs	Multipurpose font editor	macOS	Proprietary
KalliCulator	Parametric font editor	macOS	Proprietary
Metapolator	Parametric font editor	Online	GNU General Public License
MetricsMachine	Kerning editor	macOS	Proprietary
Prepolator	Interpolation compatibility manager	macOS	Proprietary
RoboFont	Multipurpose font editor	macOS	Proprietary
RoundingUFO	Font outline rounding and inktrap tool	macOS	Proprietary
Superpolator	Multidimensional interpolation manager	macOS	Proprietary
TruFont	Multipurpose font editor	macOS	GNU General Public License
UFOStretch	Linear Interpolation App	macOS	Proprietary

== Use in open source font projects ==
The UFO format is a popular choice among open source font projects because the XML-based, multiple file format is compatible with collaborative version control systems like Git. SIL International recommends UFO as the format for new font projects.

- Source Sans Pro and Source Code Pro by Adobe Originals
- Cooper Hewitt (typeface) by Chester Jenkins for Cooper Hewitt, Smithsonian Design Museum
- Nokyung, a font for the Tai Lue script and Andika Mtihani, both by SIL International.
- Parts of the Noto fonts project are available in the UFO format.
- Open Baskerville, an open source revival of Fry's Baskerville.

== Use in programming ==
The UFO file format translates easily to object-based representation in code. In addition to RoboFab, the project that originated the UFO format, many closed and open source projects read and write UFOs, for instance the Adobe Font Development Kit for OpenType.

== See also ==
- OpenType
- Web Open Font Format
