= Margaret Lindsay Holton =

Canadian artist (born 1955)

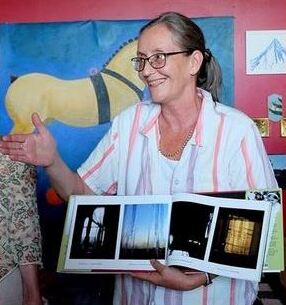
- Born: 4 April 1955 (age 71)
- Education: University of Toronto
- Occupations: Artist, designer, author, filmmaker
- Years active: 1978–present
- Website: canadadaphotography.blogspot.ca

Margaret Lindsay Holton is a Canadian artist primarily known for her 'naive-surreal-folk-abstracts' oil and acrylic paintings, pinhole photography, short documentary film productions, poetry and literary novel works.

Holton is the winner of the K.W. Irmisch 'Arts Person of the Year' Award in 2016 from the City of Burlington. In 2018, she received the Alumni of Influence award by University College, University of Toronto and was nominated for the Premier of Ontario Arts Award.

== Biography ==
=== Early life and education ===
Originally from the rural district of north Burlington Ontario, Holton attended primary school at Hillfield Strathallan College in Hamilton, and public high school at M. M. Robinson High School in Burlington, before completing a 4-year English Literature Major/Philosophy Minor B.A at the University of Toronto. Her third year at university was spent at the University of Edinburgh, where she focused on the history of the English Language.

While in Scotland, she traveled to the Outer Hebrides on a walk-study tour of the islands. She traveled through northern Ireland and stayed at a rented croft cottage on the west coast. She also traveled through eastern Russia, exploring the cities of Leningrad and Moscow. After this third year of study, she toured western Europe.

Returning to Toronto, Canada, Holton began a succession of jobs in the Canadian publishing and film industry, including: Assistant Editor at Andrew Marshall's FM GUIDE Magazine; proof-reader and typesetter at Typesettra-Fotocomp under type designer, Les Usherwood; sales rep of T.H.Best Book Binding & Printing and Production Assistant at Roseanne McWaters Vin Lint and Associates, a commercial film production house in downtown Toronto.

=== Career ===
In 1978, Holton registered her design business, MLH Productions, under which she has undertaken a number of artistic ventures. Holton is a designer of Canadian fine furniture and typefaces. She is also the author of twelve book works of poetry, prose, social history & photography. She has produced and performed for three musical CDs - Summer Haze (2014) (jazz piano), CANADADA: TAKE TWO (2017) (spoken word & electro-pop) and 'GROUP THINK' (2020). In 2015, she produced, directed and wrote a classic Canadian WW1 film, The Frozen Goose.

Holton is a pinhole and photo-collage photographer. Holton makes all of her own pinhole cameras from found cardboard boxes and tins. She hand-processes the negatives and prints in editions of one to five. All authentic MLH prints are signed, numbered and dated by her. She began pinholing in 2001 after taking a two-hour pinhole course with pinholer, Di Bos. Her pinhole works have been exhibited at the Homer Watson Public Art Gallery of Kitchener, Ontario, and Art Gallery of Burlington, Ontario, and the Sovereign House Museum of Oakville (managed by the Bronte Historical Society). In August 2010. The Art Gallery of Burlington published an exhibition monograph to the exhibition with an essay by Canadian author, David Macfarlane.

Canadian documentarian, Peter Wintonick O.C, wrote the foreword for the exhibition companion hard-cover book, Memory's Shadow: Pinhole & Photo-Collage Photography by Margaret Lindsay Holton. The title was reviewed by Jeff Mahoney, art critic for The Hamilton Spectator, who wrote, "Memory's Shadow confirms our impression of Holton as an important mixed-media practitioner, with a genuine artist's eye and a probing intellect."

==== Painting ====
Holton's paintings are "naive-surreal-folk-abstracts", a descriptive moniker that demonstrates how her work falls outside of traditional and current 'art schools'. Nature, environmental themes and planet Earth predominate in her work. Canadada: A Painter's Nature, published by Acorn Press Canada, accurately describes and illustrates her 40-year career of painting in oils and acrylics.

She has participated in over one hundred group exhibitions in Canada, the US and Europe and participated in solo and studio tours over the past two decades. Holton is a former member of the Women's Art Association of Canada, the Women's Art Association of Hamilton, the Fine Arts Society of Milton, and The Arts & Culture Collective of Burlington.

Holton moved her home and studio from Southern Ontario to Elizabethtown in Eastern Ontario in June 2023. Her studio workshop is now open by-appointment-only.

==== Type design ====
In 1979, Holton designed the 'Lindsay' (TM) typeface. Hand-drawn pencil templates were supplied to Letraset England in a license for the dry transfer 'letter' market. "Lindsay' was one of the first typeface designs to be digitized using Peter Karow's innovative IKARUS system. The 'Lindsay' typeface was used in collaboration by both Letraset and URW++ of Hamburg, Germany, as a 'demo font' to demonstrate IKARUS's capabilities in the early 1980s.

'Lindsay' was also used as the defining font for the popular board game, Carcassonne.

Holton has completed two other typeface designs, Gato and CANADA. Neither of these designs has been released to the public. They remain as 'pencil drawings' within her oeuvre of work.

==== Writing ====
Holton studied English literature at the University of Toronto, and produced her first written works in the 1980s. She began her first novel, Economic Sex, while working as an English tutor in Spain in 1984. This literary work was published by Coach House Press of Toronto, under pen-name, Ali Janna Whyte, in 1985.

She produced and edited 'The Spirit of Toronto: 1934-1984', a compendium of essays by religious leaders of 45 different faiths highlighting multiculturalism in Toronto. Launched at Fort York, a hard copy was presented to the Pope's personal secretary.

Holton registered her artist's press, Acorn Press Canada, in Ontario, in 1997. As a writing artist, she published her second novel, The Gilded Beaver by Anonymous, (1999), as well as two books of poetry, On Top of Mount Nemo (2002), and Bush Chord, (2006, with an e-edition in 2012) under her artists' imprint. The Gilded Beaver by Anonymous novel won the Hamilton Arts Council 'Best Fiction Award' in 1999. Her third novel, TRILLIUM, was self-published and released in October 2018. In June 2020, the second edition of 'The Gilded Beaver' was released on Amazon in an ebook format, identifying the author, Margaret Lindsay Holton and her client, Toronto financier Gordon H. Eberts, as the owner of the signature 'Four Canadian Fireside Chairs'. Those chairs were designed and fabricated by MLHolton. A paperback edition was released in August. In September 2021, Holton released 'Sticks and Stones: Ten Canadian Short Stories', succinctly reviewed in The Bay Observer by Robert Steven, ex-CEO of the Art Gallery of Burlington.

==== Fine furniture design and construction ====
Holton apprenticed with her father, Luther Janna Holton (1922–2002), cabinetmaker and sole-proprietor of Holton Fine Furniture of Hamilton before going into business for herself in 1986 as a Canadian fine furniture designer in Toronto under 'MLH Productions'.

Her furniture works can be found in national public and international private collections, including the Royal Ontario Museum, (curio box & display cabinets), the Canadian Film Centre, (library reception), Stanley Ho of Hong Kong (bedroom & dining room suite), David C.W. MacDonald of Toronto ('Temagami' pedestals, 'Wolf Settee Courting Bench' & 'Thee Mirror), Rosamond Ivey of Toronto (bedroom suite) and Elizabeth Hanson of Toronto (children beds).

The Hanson commission of 'three children's beds designed by MLH' was published in 'Furniture: Architects & Designers Originals' by Carol Soucek King, MFA, PhD in 1994. Holton and Frank Gehry were the only Canadians honoured in this publication about international furniture designers.

One commission, 'The Four Canadian Fireside Chairs' was the subject of her second novel, The Gilded Beaver by Anonymous.

==== Filmmaking ====
Holton began working in film with Jane Walker Manchee, as co-producer, director, writer and sound recordist for their first 54 min documentary, In the Eye of the Hunter (1984-1986). The film was broadcast on Cable 10, Toronto, for six months in a late night spot.

Over the last 20 years, Holton has created over forty additional short documentary films, under 15 minutes each. In 2015, Holton's film & photographic works were shown in The World's Shortest Film Fest, as part of the Niagara Film Festival and Oakville Film Festival. Her 14-minute documentary, 'Harold Dickert: Burlington Luthier', was shown at the Hamilton Music & Film Festival in September 2015. Her documentary, 'David Lambert: Fastest Knot-Tyer in Canada', was shown at the 10th Annual Hamilton Film Festival in November 2015.

Her first dramatic narrative short film (25 minutes), The Frozen Goose, was based on her published short story of the same name, included as the end story in the WW1 anthology, Engraved: Canadian Stories of WW1, published by Seriphim Editions in 2014. Shot in February 2016, with a cast of five, at Westfield Heritage Centre in Rockton and other rural historic locations, the world premier of this period film was held at the Art Gallery of Burlington, on September 11, 2016. It screened twice during the 11th Annual Hamilton Film Festival. After a brief local theatrical release, it was broadcast on COGECO Halton during Remembrance Week and on CABLE 14 Hamilton as a Christmas Special on December 16, 2017. The film has since been licensed to educational distributor, McIntyre Media, for the domestic market.
