= FF Meta =

Humanist sans-serif typeface

- Category: Sans-serif
- Classification: Humanist sans-serif
- Designer: Erik Spiekermann
- Foundry: FontFont
- Date created: 1985
- Date released: 1991

FF Meta is a humanist sans-serif typeface family designed by Erik Spiekermann and released in 1991 through his FontFont library.

According to Spiekermann, FF Meta was intended to be a "complete antithesis of Helvetica", which he found "boring and bland". It originated from an unused commission for the Deutsche Bundespost (German Federal Post Office). Throughout the 1990s, FF Meta was embraced by the international design community with Spiekermann and E. M. Ginger writing that it had been dubiously praised as the Helvetica of the 1990s.

FF Meta has been adopted by numerous corporations and other organizations as a corporate typeface, for signage or in their logo. These include Imperial College London, The Weather Channel, the television stations WSYR-TV, WIVT and WUTR in upstate New York, Herman Miller, Zimmer Holdings, Mozilla Corporation, Mozilla Foundation, Schaeffler Group, Endemol, Greggs, Digital UK (now Everyone TV), Liberal Democrats, Mumsnet and Fort Wayne International Airport. The University of Hull uses FF Meta Serif alongside FF Meta. The Government of Greece has used FF Meta Greek as the official government typeface since 2010. New York Review Books uses FF Meta for their covers.

== Visually distinctive characteristics ==
Characteristics of this typeface are:

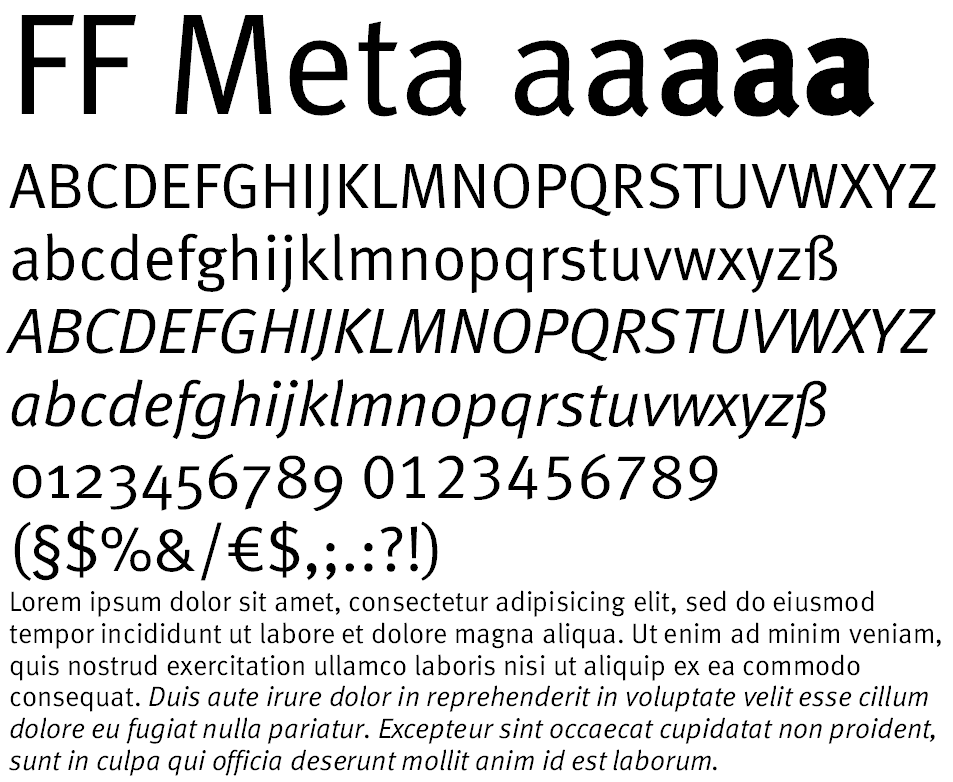
Samples of FF Meta

Upper case

- Angled letter M, more resembling Futura or an upturned W than Helvetica or Gill Sans
- Slanted upper terminal on the top right of E, F, and T. E and T are asymmetrical.

Lower case

- Round dot over the letter i and j
- Ends of the letter s nearly horizontal
- Curved bottom of l, making it clearly different from a 1 or upper-case I
- Double-storey a with a very open aperture at the top
- Bottom loop in binocular g not fully closed
- Bend to the left at the top of the letters b, h, k, l
- Bend to the right at the top of the letter d
- A very distinctive y where the two strokes do not join smoothly

A general feature of FF Meta is relatively open apertures, in contrast to the more folded-up appearance of Helvetica. This is believed to promote legibility and make the letterforms more clearly different from one another.

== Development ==
Development began in February 1985 when Deutsche Bundespost approached Sedley Place Design, where Spiekermann was working at the time, and commissioned a comprehensive corporate design program. As the typeface would be used repeatedly in small sizes, for identification rather than body copy, and printed quickly on potentially poor-quality paper stock, the brief called for a legible, neutral, space-saving, and distinguishable (in terms of weight) typeface, with special attention to creating unmistakable characters. Whereas traditionally, typefaces are designed to be viewed beautifully large, the goal with this particular typeface was to produce a typeface which worked well for its primary application.

Taking into account, research done on six font families and the constraints of the brief, the characteristics of what would become FF Meta began to take shape. The typeface would have to be sans-serif, narrow, with strokes thick enough to withstand uneven printing, curves, indentations, and flares to prevent optical illusions, open joins to combat over-inking, and clearly distinguishable glyphs. Its capitals and figures had to be versatile and clear, but not obtrusive. In addition to these demands, to meet Bundespost's needs, the family would also contain three fonts: regular, regular italic, and bold. The typeface is particularly similar to Syntax, one of Spiekermann's candidate typefaces.

After completing and digitizing the typesetting font, mockups were generated for Bundespost's new forms and publication. However, despite positive interest from the German Minister of Telecommunications among others, Bundespost decided not to implement the new exclusive typeface for fear it would "cause unrest". Bundespost, despite funding the project, continued to use a variety of different versions of Helvetica (before changing them to Frutiger). Spiekermann wrote an article on the abandoned design for Baseline magazine in 1986. At this time Meta was called PT55 (for the regular weight) and PT75 (bold).

== Releases ==
The Weather Channel logo, using FF Meta

Several years later, realizing that neither Bundespost nor Sedley Place Design would ever use the typeface, Spiekermann decided to continue working on it. He eventually published it, along with other abandoned typefaces, through his newly founded publishing label FontFont. The result was the release of FF Meta in 1991. This version of FF Meta was created by re-digitizing the original outlines and digitizing them in Fontographer on a Macintosh. This work was done by Spiekermann's interns Just van Rossum and Erik van Blokland between 1988 and 1989.

- 1991 FF Meta family released containing normal, normal small caps, and bold.
- 1992 FF Meta 2 released as an expansion adding an italics weight, and small caps for bold.
- 1993 FF MetaPlus released featuring some fine tuning of characters, spacing, and kerning along with the introducing three new weights: book, medium, and black in roman, italics, roman small caps, and roman small caps italics except for black which lacked small caps.
- 1998 FF Meta reorganized and released with the following families: FF Meta Normal, FF Meta Book, FF Meta Medium, FF Meta Bold and FF Meta Black, all in roman, italic, small caps and italic small caps, which came with their respective expert and lining figures.
- Sometime before 2005 foreign language versions by Tagir Safayev and Olga Chayeva, a condensed family, and additional light weights were added as: FF Meta Light, FF Meta Thin, and FF Meta Hairline.
- 2005 FF Meta Headline
- 2007 A serif companion, entitled FF Meta Serif, was completed and released.
- 2011 A Hebrew version was released.
- 2013 Fira Sans, a free derivative for Mozilla's Firefox OS.
- 2018 FiraGO, a multilingual extension of Fira Sans was released.
- 2018 FF Meta Variable, a variable version of FF Meta produced by Marianna Paszkowska, was released.

== Personnel ==
Writing in 1987, Spiekermann gave these credits for Meta as originally designed for the Bundespost.

- Original sketches, concept, and research for FF Meta by Erik Spiekermann and Michael Bitter at Sedley Place Design, Berlin.
- Design of the completed alphabets by Gerry Barney and Mike Pratley at Sedley Place, London.
