= Just van Rossum =

Dutch typographer

Just van Rossum (born 1966 in Haarlem) is a Dutch typeface designer, software developer, and professor at the Royal Academy of Art in the Hague. He is the co-founder of design firm, LettError, along with Erik van Blokland. Just van Rossum is the younger brother of Guido van Rossum, creator of the Python programming language.

== Early life and education ==
Just van Rossum was born and raised in the Netherlands alongside his brother Guido and his sister Saskia. In 1981, his father bought a Sinclair ZX81 home computer. The ZX81's primary function was to allow the user to write programs in BASIC. As a result, Van Rossum developed an understanding of computer science principles in his teenage years, an advantage that would influence his identity and philosophy as a designer.

In 1984, Just van Rossum enrolled in the Royal Academy of Art in the Hague, where he studied under Gerrit Noordzij, an influential Dutch typeface designer and author. Sensing potential, Noordzij approached Just in a hallway and introduced him to fellow student Erik van Blokland who happened to be the younger brother of reputable typeface designer, Petr van Blokland. Noordzij allegedly grabbed both students by their wrists and said "I think the two of you ought to talk". Just van Rossum and Erik van Blokland developed a relationship that continued throughout their careers.

== Work ==
=== MetaDesign ===
After graduating from the Royal Academy of Art in the Hague in 1988, Just van Rossum joined the Berlin design firm, MetaDesign, as an intern while the company was still in its infancy. There, MetaDesign founder, Erik Spiekermann, tasked Just with finishing a new typeface that Spiekermann had been working on. Impressed by the quality of his revisions, Spiekermann hired Just as a fulltime employee and credited him as a co-designer of the typeface, which was later published as ITC Officina Serif (EF) in 1990.

During his stay at MetaDesign, Just's friend and fellow student, Erik van Blokland, was also hired as an intern after graduating in 1989. While working together in Berlin, the two interns began theorizing about potential innovations in typeface design, culminating in their joint publishing of an indie magazine in that same year titled: LettError. The magazine primarily consists of editorials denouncing the overreliance on Bézier curves and the lack of innovation by typeface designers using PostScript. The LettError magazine encapsulated the anarchic and rebellious vision of its editors, containing layered and misaligned prints as well as sardonic fake adverts. One such advert describes a fictitious typography, textbook poking fun at their current employer (Spiekermann) and prior academic upbringing, a phony review exclaiming: "At Last a Book About Typography NOT Written By Erik Spiekermann". The magazine proposed the idea of a "Random Font" which would produce glyphs with unexpected variations upon every print, as opposed to the uniformity provided by a typical typeface.

=== LettError ===
Borrowing the name from their previously published magazine, Just van Rossum and Erik van Blokland formed a business partnership, referring to themselves collectively as LettError.

==== FF Beowolf ====
LettError published its first typeface in 1990, titled FF Beowolf. It is a serif typeface and the first proof of concept of a "Random Font" as theorized by the duo in 1989. The programming behind the typeface effectively subverts Postscript standard practices by replacing standard commands with an original function written by Just and Erik. In Postscript, the commands "lineto" and "curveto" are used to draw lines and curves from one point towards another, forming the shape of the final glyph. The team wrote a new function, "freakto", which was similar to "lineto", with the key difference that the destination point would be randomly generated somewhere near the intended location. FF Beowolf is a modification made to the roman typeface, Kwadraat, where uses of "lineto" and "curveto" are replaced with "freakto". The result is a jagged, angular typeface that appears different every time it is printed.

Aside from being the first procedurally generated typeface, FF Beowolf is also the first typeface distributed by Berlin-based type foundry, FontShop (hence the FF prefix which denotes that the typeface is a member of the FontFont library, distributed by FontShop).

In 2011, FF Beowolf was one of 23 typefaces acquired by the Museum of Modern Art in New York as part of their Standard Deviations exhibition, displaying important digital fonts.

==== FF Hands ====
Returning from a type conference in 1990, Just van Rossum and Erik van Blokland had the idea for their follow up to the success of FF Beowolf, the FF Hands series. FF Hands consisted of two fonts developed by scanning and digitizing alphabets handwritten by each designer. Aptly, these typefaces were named FF Justlefthand and FF Erikrighthand, denoting the author of the original handwriting as well as their dominant hand. The FF Hands typefaces were the first fonts created by scanning handwriting.

==== FF InstantTypes ====
In 1992, LettError released a series of five fonts designed exclusively by Just van Rossum. The InstantTypes collection consisted of typefaces developed by digitizing the text on various household items including: cardboard boxes (FF Karton), children's stamps (FF Stamp Gothic), and Dymo label tape (FF Dynamoe).

==== Twin ====
In 2002, the Design Institute at the University of Minnesota held a competition between six typeface designers to promote the upcoming 2003 Twin Cities Design Celebration. The designers were each asked to develop a proposal for a font that would represent Minneapolis and St. Paul. Just van Rossum and Erik van Blokland collaborated on the font Twin which won the competition. Twin was a typeface whose characteristics would be procedurally generated by a "Panchromatic Hybrid Style Alternator". The software used internet data regarding the Twin Cities such as current reported air temperature to determine the shape and style of the final glyphs.

== Software ==
=== RoboFog ===
In the early 1990s, Just van Rossum collaborated with Petr van Blokland (older brother of Erik van Blokland) to develop the RoboFog software. RoboFog was a software based primarily on the code of an older font editor called Fontographer. Just and Petr developed a python interpreter that would allow users to programmatically design and change the user interface themselves. The original Fontographer code soon became obsolete and the userbase of RoboFog moved away towards software such as FontLab.

=== DrawBot ===
In 2003, Just van Rossum developed DrawBot, a macOS software for teaching typeface designers about programming. DrawBot consisted of a text editor that allowed the user to programmatically define shapes using simplified Python functions and a canvas that would display the compiled result of the code. It was later redesigned in 2013 by Frederik Berlaen (a star pupil of Just at KABK who graduated in 2007).

=== RoboFab ===
In 1997, after a meeting with Just van Rossum, software designer, Yuri Yarmola, decided to integrate a Python interpreter into his font editor software, FontLab 4. Just van Rossum had previously worked on the software, RoboFog, which was a Python interpreter for the software Fontographer, which had since been succeeded in popularity by FontLab. Just van Rossum, Erik van Blokland, and Tal Lemming developed the RoboFab API which was used to help programmers with UI design in the newly Python programmable FontLab software. RoboFab made it easy for RoboFog developers to port over their code from Fontographer to FontLab.

=== FontTools ===
In 1999, Just van Rossum released the FontTools/TTX package. FontTools is an opensource Python library that allows users to manipulate binary fonts. Alongside FontTools, Just released TTX, which was a tool for converting OpenType and TrueType fonts into XML and back. The library was updated as recent as 2020 due to the support of contributors such as Behdad Esfahbod.

=== FontGoggles ===
In 2020, Van Rossum released FontGoggles, an open-source font viewer for interactive previewing and comparing. Its main focus is "text behavior, specifically text shaping and variation behavior". It's especially recommended for type designers, as a tool to inspect how the more recent font technologies, variable fonts and OpenType features perform in typefaces that are in the design/production phase.

== Notable typefaces ==
- FF Beowolf
- ITC Officina Serif (EF)
- Phaistos
- FF Beosans
- FF Justlefthand
- FF Advert
- FF Schulschrift
- FF Schulbuch
- FF Brokenscript
- FF Stamp Gothic
- FF Confidential
- FF Flightcase
- FF Karton
- FF Dynamoe
- FF Double Digits
- Twin
