= AdZyklopädie =

Digital archive for advertising

'AdZyklopädie' is a German coined word with the meaning encyclopedia for advertisements. The AdZyklopädie is a digital archive for advertising, independently storing old and current advertisements from different media on a large scale – advertisements from public or professional journals, newspapers, TV, cinema, posters/Out-of-Home, internet, Infoscreen, digital signage, airport advertising, radio advertising.

== History ==
Advertisements in publications form a big part of advertising and are a cultural property. Advertisements are developed, designed and provided with text by creative people of advertising agencies, but they cannot be found in any state-archive. Until the end of 1990 in Germany only Stefan Rögener with his company AdFinder in Hamburg and Marien Riepelmeier in connection with the BBDO Düsseldorf archived advertisements in an extensive way and offered them to advertising agencies for research, because for the creation of new advertising campaigns it is important to know former advertising for the same product by different providers and how competitors currently advertise the product.

1998 the archive AdFinder rapidly became too small and Stefan Rögener and Peter Karow had the, at that time rakish, idea to digitalize advertisements and offer them via internet. This could do away with the limited space and guarantee great up-to-dateness and availability. They found an innovative business management at the GWA headquarter (German Association of Communication Agencies) and concluded a cooperation agreement about the future online use of the archive with the GWA. In the same year they founded the company AdVision digital GmbH in Hamburg.

== Description ==
The AdZyklopädie provides advertising in printed media since 1947 and TV advertisements since 1970. It is almost not possible to explore the history of advertising beyond 1947, because there are no generally available digital collections. Now, at the beginning of 2017, the archive contains more than 6.5 million advertising campaigns and the 50 employees of AdVision regularly archive about 1,500 national and international titles from public and professional journals, 100 daily newspapers and 75 TV stations – approximately 70,000 advertising campaigns per month. So the AdZyklopädie is the biggest archive for advertising campaigns in Germany. Thanks to the huge amount of stored criteria nowadays it is even possible to explore the relative importance of a campaign according to different criteria like diversification, effects, costs and media. The online archive is especially available to advertising agencies and advertisers via a research subscription. For competition monitoring the AdZyklopädie especially allows investigating media and schematic plans as well as spendings of individual companies or branches.

== Search criteria ==
For each advertising campaign the following search criteria are stored:;

branch, segment, product group, company, brand, product, date, type of media, medium, advertising expenses, design code, credits, slogans/claims, full-text

The design code permits to categorize (category, aspect, element) 700 creative aspects or aspects regarding content and supplement them with details worth knowing like ADC (Art Directors Club) Awards, Cannes Lions or Clio Awards. Design code categories are architecture, food/drinks, objects, geography, culture/art, landscape, people, plants/animals, sports/free time, textures/typography.

The credits contain the doers behind the advertising campaigns like director, consultant, film production, cameraman, etc.

Slogans/Claims are separately stored in the field of print advertisements.

Furthermore, the continuous text of print advertisements is archived for full-text search. Editorial texts of journals and newspapers are read and searched by the frequency of special product denominations. Storylines are stored for a selection of TV and radio spots.

== Reception in science and teaching ==
Students and teachers of graphic design can use the data free of charge, but have to register with AdVision. The contents of the AdZyklopädie are also used by professors for graphic design in scientific thesis.
