= Comparison of font editors =

This is a technical feature comparison of font editors.

== General ==
Basic general information about font editors: creator, first release date, latest stable version, latest release date and license.

Software	Creator	First release date	Latest stable version	Latest release date	License
DTL FontMaster	Dutch Type Library		3.0		Proprietary
DTL FontMaster Light	Dutch Type Library		2.7		Free
FontForge	George Williams		20251009	9 October 2025	GPL3
FontLab	Yuri Yarmola	1993	8.4.2.8950	September 25, 2024	Proprietary
Fontographer	Jim von Ehr		5.2		Proprietary
Fontra	Just van Rossum	2021	2026.10.0	Oct 5, 2026	GPL3
Glyphs	Georg Seifert	2011	3.4	October 8, 2025	Proprietary, file format and parts of the code open source
Ikarus					Proprietary

== Operating system support ==
The table below lists the operating systems on which each font editor can run.

Software	Windows	MacOS	Linux	Android	iOS
DTL FontMaster	Yes				
DTL FontMaster Light	Yes				
FontForge	Yes	Yes	Yes		
FontLab	Yes	Yes			
Fontra	Yes	Yes	Yes		
Glyphs	No	Yes			

== General features ==
Below is an overview of general features typical for font editors.

Software	Maximum number of glyphs supported	Colored glyphs	Windows Type 1 (.pfb) editor	Mac Type 1 (LWFN) editor	OpenType TT / TrueType (.ttf) editor	Mac TrueType (sfnt/dfont) editor	TrueType Collection (.ttc) editor	OpenType PS (.otf) editor	Macro / Script
FontForge		No	import and export	import and export	import and export	import and export	import and export	import and export	Yes
FontLab	unlimited in source file	COLR, CPAL, SBIX, SVG	import & export		import & export	import	import	import & export	Python scripting
Glyphs	unlimited in source file	COLR, CPAL, SBIX, SVG	import	import	import & export	import	import	import & export	Python script and plug-ins, Objective-C plug-ins, free SDK available

The OpenType cmap table can reference a maximum of 65536 glyphs.

== TrueType hinting ==
Font editors supporting TrueType hinting can do that either automatically or manually. The availability of these functions and the possibility to debug hinting is indicated in the following table.

Software	Automatic TrueType hinting	Manual TrueType hinting	TrueType hinting debugger
FontLab	ttfAutohint & FontLab	GUI	code preview and rendering previews, including Windows ClearType on macOS
Glyphs	ttfAutohint	GUI	live preview of 3 renderings
FontForge	yes (unknown type)	yes	yes (when compiled in)

== See also ==
- Font editor
- Comparison of vector graphics editors
