= Erik van Blokland =

Dutch typeface designer

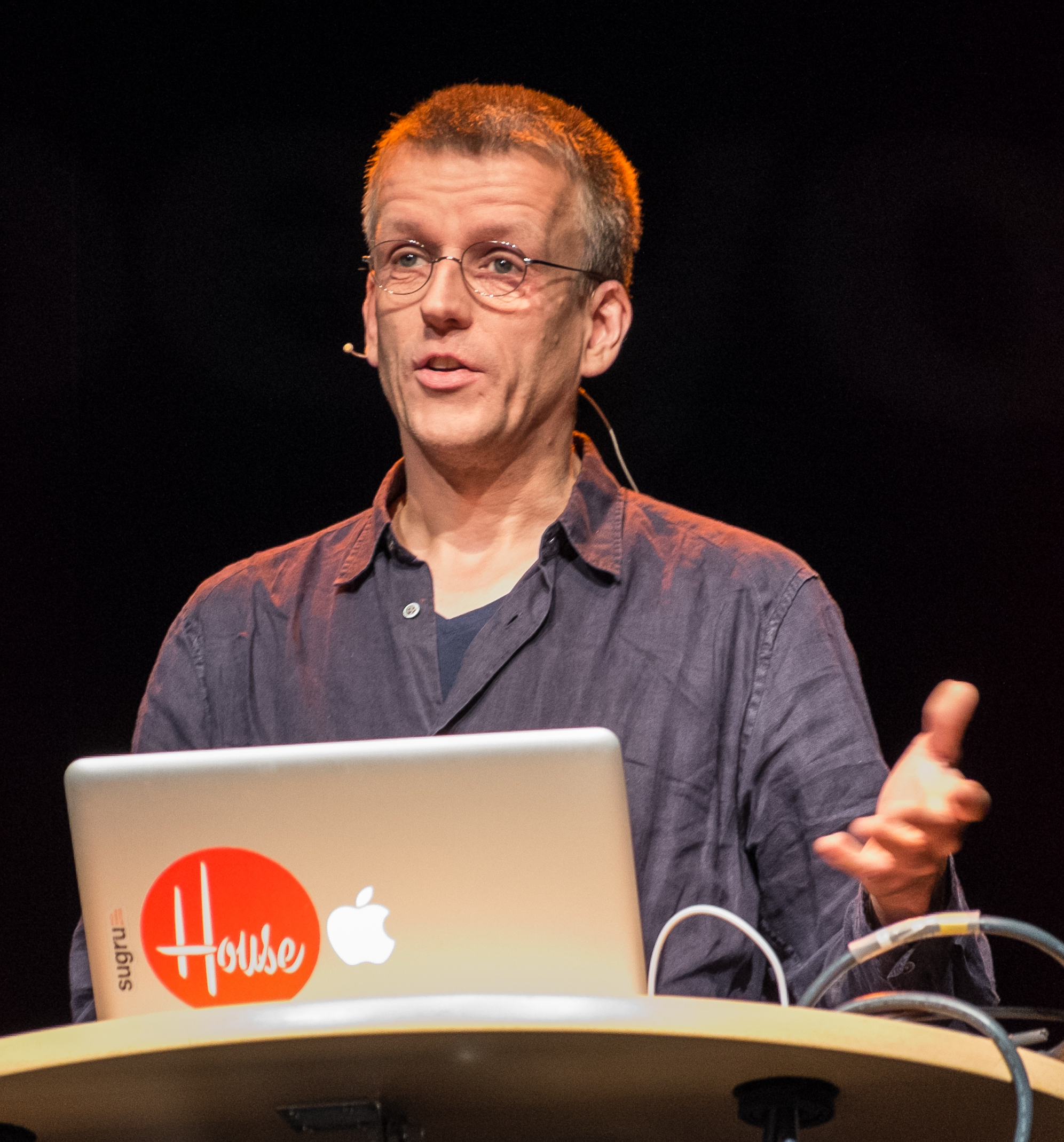
- Van Blokland in 2013
- Born: August 29, 1967 (age 59)
- Occupations: typeface designer, educator and computer programmer
- Known for: Unified Font Object (UFO); Web Open Font Format (WOFF)
- Notable work: LTR or FF Beowolf

Erik van Blokland (born 29 August 1967 in Gouda) is a Dutch typeface designer, educator and computer programmer. He is the head of the Type Media Master of Design program in Typeface Design at the Royal Academy of Art, The Hague in the Netherlands.

== Letterror ==
Letterror is the name of the collaborative efforts of Erik van Blokland and Just van Rossum. While studying at Royal Academy of Art, The Hague, the two were introduced by the school's professor of Type Design, Gerrit Noordzij, who "knew they shared an enthusiasm for computers and programming". Their collaboration started in earnest in Berlin in 1989 around the time the duo were working for Erik Spiekermann. First they published zine, which was named Letterror, which demonstrated their experiments with generative type. That name followed their collaboration through the years.

== LTR Beowolf ==
LTR Beowolf is a Serif-typeface which had novel programming features. Each time it was printed, code within the typeface files moved the outlines of the letters around slightly, giving it a spiky appearance. The two designers, van Blokland and Just van Rossum, discovered that PostScript 1 format typeface files contained code that they could edit directly, adding randomization points to the line positioning points that usually make up such a file.

It is thought to be the first dynamically generated typeface, which modified letterforms on the fly. It used a randomizing algorithm to generate different letter forms each time a letter was printed. The typeface "expanded the possibilities of typography", introducing Generative design to type.

It was published under the name FF Beowolf, the first typeface in the FontFont library.

The specifications of printer drivers were updated in time to curtail "aberrations", so in the end FF Beowulf stopped working. Later versions of the typeface do not include the random feature that made it famous, as current font technology does not support programming features within typefaces, for security reasons. Instead they use a feature called "contextual alternates" to swap out the basic set of letters with pre-randomized alternative letters, when certain letter combinations occur in context, from a pool of over 90.000 alternate letters.

LTR Beowolf was one of 23 typefaces in the MoMA Architecture and Design Collection's first type acquisition in 2011. Each typeface in the group was selected as a "milestone in the history of typography". The typefaces were exhibited at the Standard Deviations exhibition in March of the same year.

== Trixie, Instant Types and Grunge Type ==
Following Beowulf, the design duo discovered that they could create previously unseen typefaces that evoked the printed look of amateur letter tools like stamps, typewriters, name tag makers and other household items. By combining a scanner, and recently available computer programs, such as image vector tracing software, Photoshop, Illustrator and early type design program Fontographer, they could create much more complex typefaces by automating the process, using the aforementioned software. These "grunge" shapes had messy, complicated outlines, which would have been extremely difficult to produce using analogue methods. Also called "distressed type", this mode of typeface creation became very popular, and a large number of "grunge" typefaces were created. Letterror's Justlefthand and Erikrighthand typefaces were the first digital "handwriting" fonts, their introduction was described as evidence that "the computer brings more, not less human expression into [graphic design]"Forms in modernism : a visual set : the unity of typography, architecture & the design arts They were the first releases from this project. Erik's typeface Trixie was the second one, it came out in 1991, a year before RayGun magazine signaled the formal beginning of Grunge Design. It was famously used in the iconic logo for The X-files TV series, and also on the covers of Rage Against The Machine's eponymous debut album and Alanis Morissette's Jagged Little Pill. Just van Rossum's Instant Types set fonts came out a year later, adding five iconic typefaces to the new category.

Other typefaces of note include Eames Century Modern, a typeface based on the legacy of Charles and Ray Eames, designed with the co-operation of The Eames Office for House Industries and LTR Federal, a highly intricate interpretation of the typography of bank notes, based on a study of siderography - the steel engraving process used for currency and old fashioned stocks. Later works include Action Condensed, which the NBA used for a redesign of their logo and graphic identity.

== Programming ==
Erik has made several contributions to programming related to type design. He is the co-author of Unified Font Object (UFO), the open, XML based file format for font data. He co-authored WOFF, the Web Open Font Format. He developed the RoboFab type design extensions for Python with Just van Rossum and Tal Leming. He's the author of Superpolator, the application for interpolating font styles.
