= Anita Kunz =

Canadian-born artist and illustrator

- Born: Toronto, Ontario, Canada
- Known for: Illustration

Anita E. Kunz, OC, DFA, RCA is a Canadian-born artist and illustrator. She was the first woman and first Canadian to have a solo exhibit at the Library of Congress in Washington, D.C.

== Life and early career ==
Kunz was born in Toronto, Ontario, and grew up in Kitchener. In her early life, she was influenced by the illustration work of her uncle, Robert Kunz, who created art for educational publishing. His work imparted to her the potential for illustration to hold social messages, leading her to study at the Ontario College of Art, from which she graduated in 1978. She started sending her work to various magazines after beginning her career with assignments in advertising.

Kunz states that studying the works of British artists like Sue Coe, Russell Mills, Ralph Steadman and Ian Pollock helped her to understand that illustration could be used to personally express "a strong political or social viewpoint." As a Canadian who recognizes the extent to which Canada is immersed in American culture and politics, she believes that responding visually from a Canadian perspective is imperative. Consequently, she sought work in the United States and acquired the majority of her clients there.

In particular, she caught the attention of American art director Fred Woodward when he commissioned an illustration of Ray Charles for Westward magazine in 1982. Her depiction of Charles "with piano keys for teeth" exceeded Woodward's expectations and prompted their working relationship through his transitions to Texas Monthly, Regardie's, and Rolling Stone. For Woodward, Kunz was an obvious choice to be one of the two artists illustrating for his back-of-the-magazine series called "The History of Rock and Roll," which ran from 1988 to 1990.

== Career and achievements ==
Kunz has lived in London, New York City and Toronto, contributing to magazines and working for design firms, book publishers and advertising agencies in Germany, Japan, Sweden, Norway, Canada, South Africa, Holland, Portugal, France and England. Her many clients include Time magazine, Rolling Stone, Vanity Fair, The New Yorker, GQ, The New York Times, Sony Music, and Random House Publishing. She has illustrated over fifty book jacket covers and has created cover art and editorial illustrations for many magazines including Rolling Stone, The New Yorker, Sports Illustrated, Time Magazine, Newsweek Magazine, the Atlantic Monthly and The New York Times Magazine, earning commissions of up to US$5,000. Kunz has been commissioned by The New Yorker for more than twenty covers.

She has had exhibitions since 1987, when she showed a collection of her works at Canada House in Trafalgar Square, London. In 1997, she put on a one-woman show at the Foreign Press office in New York City. In 1998, she had a solo show at Tokyo's Creation Gallery. The Society of Illustrators' Museum of American Illustration honoured her with a mid-career retrospective of her work in 2002.

Kunz is also involved in educating and helping other artists. She has held summer workshops for the Master of Arts program at Syracuse University at the Illustration Academy in Sarasota, Florida. She also often leads workshops and gives lectures at universities and institutions such as the Smithsonian Institution and the Corcoran College of Art and Design in Washington, DC.

Her paintings and sculptures have been featured in galleries abroad, including the Norman Rockwell Museum in Massachusetts and the Teatrio Cultural Association in Rome, Italy.

In the fall of 2003, Kunz was the first woman and the first Canadian to have a solo show at the Library of Congress in Washington, DC. The show was titled Canadian Counterpoint and featured a selection of 15 of the 22 paintings that she donated for a permanent collection at the Library of Congress.

The National Post has named her one of the fifty most influential Canadian women.

In 2007, Kunz was inducted as a member into the Royal Canadian Academy of Arts.

In 2017, she was inducted into The Society of Illustrators' Hall of Fame at the Museum of American Illustration in New York. She was also the "2017 J.E.H. MacDonald Honorary Member for Painting" at The Arts and Letters Club of Toronto.

In 2004, Canada Post used illustrations by Kunz on stamps issued for the Year of the Monkey. On 5 April 2018, Canada Post celebrated Kunz and four other prolific Canadian illustrators by issuing a stamp series featuring their works. The issue is called "Great Canadian Illustrators" and was released at OCAD University.

Kunz has written three art books, Another History of Art published by Fantagraphics Books in spring 2021 and Original Sisters: Portraits of Tenacity and Courage with a foreword by Roxane Gay released in the fall of 2021. She also produced a book of nudes entitled A Handy Guide to the Male Nude published by Fantagraphics, in 2023.

From 2020 through 2025, she painted 500 portraits of extraordinary and unseen women; the series is called Original Sisters. In 2021, Kunz discussed these portraits and her equally feminist but far more fantastical vision of art history" in The New Yorker Magazine.

The Norman Rockwell Museum mounted a solo show of her work in 2024 showcasing 280 original portraits of extraordinary women entitled "Original Sisters: Portraits of Tenacity and Courage." Also included are a number of her New Yorker cover illustrations.

She is represented by The Philippe Labaune Gallery in New York City.

== Awards ==
In 1997, Kunz was the recipient of the Les Usherwood Lifetime Achievement Award from the Advertising and Design Club of Canada.

She received the Hamilton King Award from the Society of Illustrators in 2003.

In 2009, Kunz was appointed Officer of the Order of Canada "for her contributions as an illustrator whose insightful works have graced publications around the world". She was also a recipient of the Queen Elizabeth II Diamond Jubilee Medal in 2012.

In 2010, Kunz was awarded an honorary Doctorate of Fine Arts from her alma mater, OCAD University. She was given a second Honorary DFA by Massachusetts College of Art and Design in 2015. And a third Honorary Doctorate was bestowed on her from the Pacific Northwest College of Art in 2024

In 2016, Kunz was one of three winners of Applied Arts magazine's Golden AACE (Applied Arts Creative Excellence) lifetime achievement Awards. Of the three primary disciplines covered by the magazine, Kunz won for the Image category.

Kunz was recognized by her alma mater again when she was one of the 2017 recipients of the Alumni of Influence Awards. She was awarded as Distinguished Alumni.

== Permanent collections ==
There are permanent collections of her work at the Library of Congress, the Archives of Canada in Ottawa, the McCord Museum in Montreal, the Museum of Contemporary Art in Rome. As well, some of her Time Magazine cover paintings are in the permanent collection at the Smithsonian's National Portrait Gallery in Washington, DC.

== Influences and values ==
Kunz points to the Northern Renaissance works of Flemish painter Rogier van der Weyden as an influence for her illustration style. A comparison of their works would reveal "the same elongated forms, the same finger-crooked hands, the same skin tones glowing like pearl and old pewter. 'His work is beautiful and spooky at the same time,' says Kunz." Descriptions of Kunz's work by other artists confirm her commitment to detail and her Flemish influence. Milton Glaser, the American graphic designer who invented the I Love New York logo, said that Kunz is "almost Flemish in her sense of detail and finish. She also has a certain Flemish sense of the grotesque." Françoise Mouly, art editor of The New Yorker and wife of Art Spiegelman, expressed her fondness for the "sheer luxury of detail in Anita's work."

Given the influence of her uncle and various British artists, Kunz has been open about expressing her values as an artist. She aims to use her art to widely communicate concepts that are novel and challenging. To illustration, Kunz ascribes "the power, potentially, to move people emotionally and challenge them intellectually. By its very nature, illustration can question conventions and generate reaction." To produce these effects, she states that it is crucial to be flexible and to continually consider oneself a student of human nature. Since she uses her art to communicate social and political messages, she also values integrity regarding the publications that feature her work, and thus declines commissions that oppose the causes she stands by or that threaten to compromise her values.

In the early 2000s, Kunz repeatedly expressed her concern that publications were becoming more focused on celebrity culture and commercial advertisements than on intellectual and conceptual subject matter. She noticed the change beginning in the early 1990s, and expected the political focus to resume after 9/11. Instead, her first commission following the attacks was for a portrait of Britney Spears, and Kunz began to notice herself and other artists — such as American photographer Susan Sontag and American cartoonist Michael Ramirez — facing restrictions on their freedom of expression. In addition to receiving more celebrity portrait commissions than serious ones, U.S. military officials periodically visited her website following her April 2003 cover illustration of George W. Bush as an oil sheik for The American Prospect. The turn away from strong political opinions impacted the selection of Kunz's works for her solo show at the Library of Congress; the majority of the fifteen selections are celebrity portraits. Kunz's publicist, Laura Goldstein, stated that "the whole exhibit is called Canadian Counterpoint, but they're still selecting what the 'Counterpoint' is." Despite her concern, Kunz herself confidently expressed her belief that "the need for astute, suggestive and intellectual illustration will never cease."
