= Gerrit Noordzij Prize =

- Description: Extraordinary contributions to type design, typography, and education
- Country: Netherlands
- Presented by: Royal Academy of Art, The Hague (KABK)
- Website: http://gnprize.org/

The Gerrit Noordzij Prize is given to type designers and typographers for extraordinary contributions to the fields of type design, typography and type education. The prize, initiated by Anno Fekkes during the 1996 ATypI conference in The Hague, is awarded every three years by the Royal Academy of Art in The Hague together with the Museum Meermanno, under the auspices of the Dr. P.A. Tiele Trust. The prize is named after Gerrit Noordzij, who was a professor of typeface design at the Royal Academy of Art (a course that was founded by him). For the continuity of the prize, the Gerrit Noordzij Fund was created.

== The award ==
By tradition, the award itself is designed by the previous winner. In addition to this, each time the prize is awarded, an exhibition about the work of the previous winner is organized, accompanied by a publication.

Through the years, the jury has consisted of:

- Ada Lopes Cardozo (head of the graphic design department at the Royal Academy of Arts).
- Erik Spiekermann (type designer, graphic designer and co-director of FSI FontShop International)
- Fred Smeijers (type designer and teacher of type design)
- Gerard Unger (professor of typography at the University of Leiden Department of Arts)
- Gerrit Noordzij (type designer and teacher of type design)
- Jack Verduyn Lunel (director of the Royal Academy of Arts)
- Leo Voogt (director of Museum Meermanno)
- Petr van Blokland (type designer and teacher at the Royal Academy of Arts)

== Laureates ==
- 1996: Gerrit Noordzij (Netherlands)
- 2001: Fred Smeijers (Netherlands)
- 2003: Erik Spiekermann (Germany)
- 2006: Tobias Frere-Jones (United States)
- 2009: Wim Crouwel (Netherlands)
- 2012: Karel Martens (Netherlands)
- 2015: Cyrus Highsmith (United States)

== Publications ==
Different books have been published about, in honor of, or presented at the exhibitions:

- Ben Bos, Tony Brook, Tobias Frere-Jones, Karel Martens, David Quay: Wim Crouwel - Gerrit Noordzij Prize, The Hague (2012).
- Dawn Barrett, David Berlow, Matthew Carter (et al.): Tobias Frere-Jones Gerrit Noordzij Prize Exhibition, Amsterdam (2009).
- FontShop Benelux (ed.): e - Erik Spiekermann, The Hague/De Pinte (2006).
- Fred Smeijers (ed. by Robin Kinross): Type now: a manifesto, plus work so far, London (2003). (Published in honor of the exhibition Fred Smeijers: work so far).
- Mathieu Lommen, Anno Fekkes, Jan Willem Stas (et al.): Het primaat van de pen: een workshop letterontwerpen met Gerrit Noordzij, The Hague (2001).
