= Fira (typeface) =

Humanist sans-serif typeface

Fira Sans
- Category: Sans-serif
- Classification: Humanist
- Designers: Erik Spiekermann; Ralph du Carrois
- Commissioned by: Telefónica and Mozilla Corporation
- Foundry: bBox Type GmbH
- Date released: 2013
- License: SIL Open Font License
- Design based on: FF Meta
- Website: carrois.com/fira
- Latest release version: 4.301

Fira Sans is a humanist sans-serif typeface designed by Erik Spiekermann, Ralph du Carrois, Anja Meiners, Botio Nikoltchev of Carrois Type Design, and Patryk Adamczyk of Mozilla Corporation. The typeface was originally commissioned by Telefónica and Mozilla Corporation as part of the joint effort during the development of Firefox OS. It is a slightly wider and calmer adaptation of Spiekermann's typeface Meta, which was used as Mozilla's brand typeface at the time, but optimized for legibility on (small) screens. With the name “Fira,” Mozilla wanted to communicate the concepts of fire, light, and joy, but with connotatively agnostic language intended to signal the project's global nature. Fira was released in 2013 initially under the Apache License, and later reissued under the SIL Open Font License.

In its first 2013 release, Fira Sans was available in four weights with corresponding italics: light, regular, medium, and bold. In May 2014, the number of weights was increased to 16. In 2015, Mozilla added a condensed style. The family has a large character set that includes text figures and small caps.

In 2016, with version 4.2, the Mozilla Corporation ended their participation in the Fira Sans project; however, the project was continued by Berlin-based foundry bBox Type GmbH and its partners. That same year, bBox Type GmbH released Fira Sans version 4.301—the final iteration of Fira Sans—and announced that “any future developments will be based on FiraGO.”

== FiraGO ==
FiraGO
- Category: Sans-serif
- Classification: Humanist
- Designer: Erik Spiekermann
- Commissioned by: Here Technologies
- Foundry: bBox Type GmbH
- Date released: March 2018
- License: SIL Open Font License
- Design based on: Fira
- Website: carrois.com/fira/
- Latest release version: 1.001

FiraGO is a multilingual extension of Fira Sans that includes Arabic, Devanagari, Georgian, Hebrew, and Thai letters, in addition to Latin, Greek, and Cyrillic alphabets in the typeface. In 2016, the development of FiraGO was initiated after geo data provider Here Technologies selected Fira Sans as their corporate typeface, but needed the typeface to be usable for “broader language applications, especially in map applications.” Subsequently, Here Technologies commissioned bBox Type GmbH for a global script extension to Fira Sans, which was expanded into FiraGO project.

Based on Fira Sans 4.3, FiraGO was released as a separate product, and will be the main font family in the group. All future updates to Fira Sans will be based on FiraGO, and as of 2018, all Fira families are issued by bBox Type, which is headed by Ralph du Carrois and Anja Meiners.

== Fira Mono ==
Fira Mono
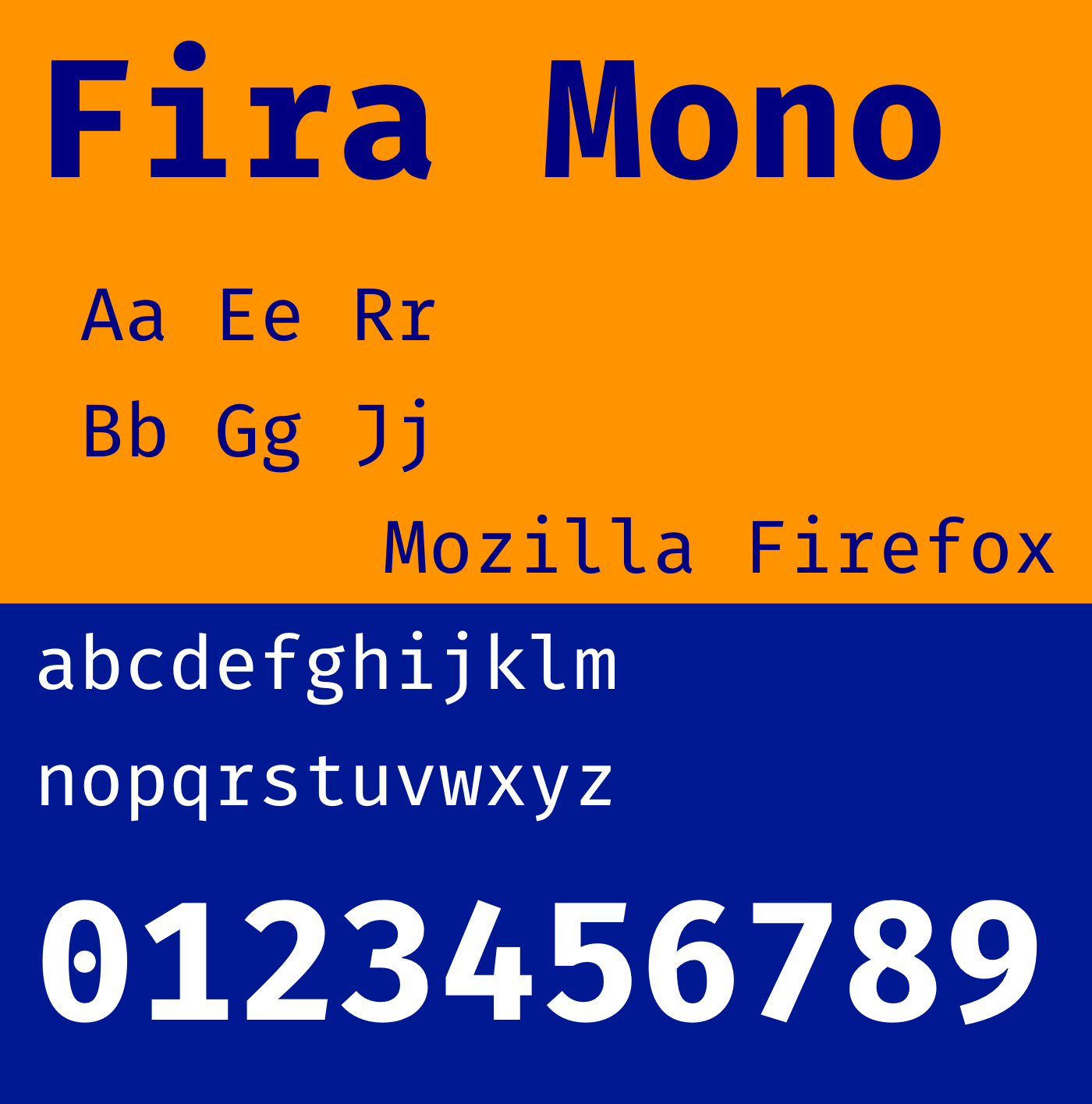
- Category: Monospaced
- Designer: Erik Spiekermann
- Foundry: bBox Type GmbH
- Date released: 2013
- License: SIL Open Font License
- Design based on: FF Meta
- Website: carrois.com/fira/
- Latest release version: 3.206

Fira Sans is accompanied by a monospaced variant called Fira Mono, available in the weights of regular, medium, and bold.

== Fira Code ==
Fira Code is an extension of the Fira Mono font that contains a set of ligatures for common programming multi-character combinations. It is available in regular, medium, bold, and light, and additionally as a variable weight font.

== Fira Math ==
Released in 2019, Fira Math is a sans-serif font with Unicode math support and is developed by Stone Zeng.

== Firava ==
Firava is an adaptation of Fira Sans into a variable version.
