= Glyphs (font editor) =

Font editor for macOS

- Developer: Glyphs GmbH
- Stable release: 4.0 / 27 July 2026; 2 months ago
- Operating system: macOS
- Type: Font editor
- License: Proprietary
- Website: glyphsapp.com

Glyphs is a font editor for macOS, intended for professionals and advanced amateurs to create digital fonts. Glyphs Mini is a related application with fewer features, at a lower price intended for beginners.

The program was developed by type designer Georg Seifert, with the first version released in 2011. It supports the creation of fonts for all scripts supported by the Opentype standards, and the use of multiple masters, and it can be scripted in Python.

== See also ==
- Comparison of font editors
