= ITC Officina =

Typeface family

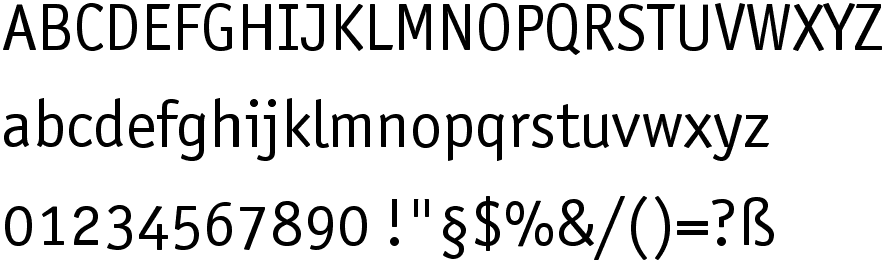
ITC Officina Sans

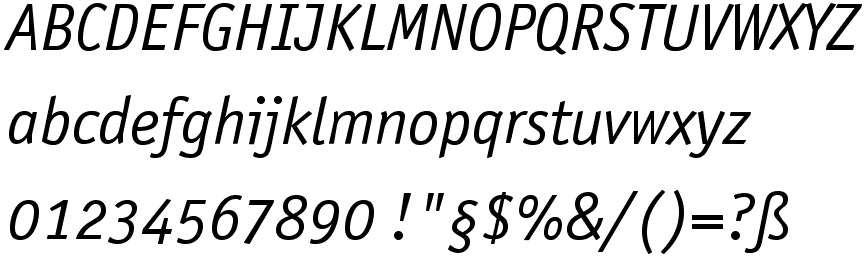
ITC Officina Sans Italic

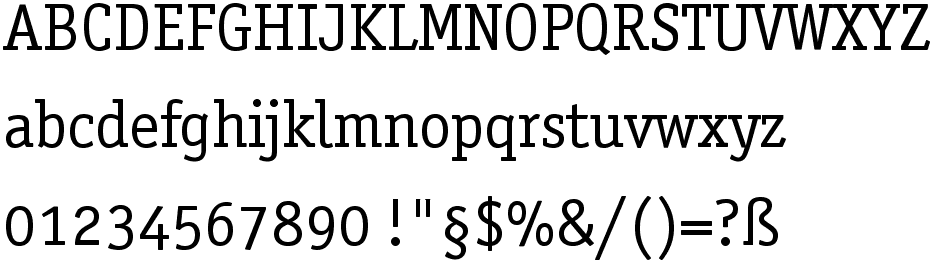
ITC Officina Serif

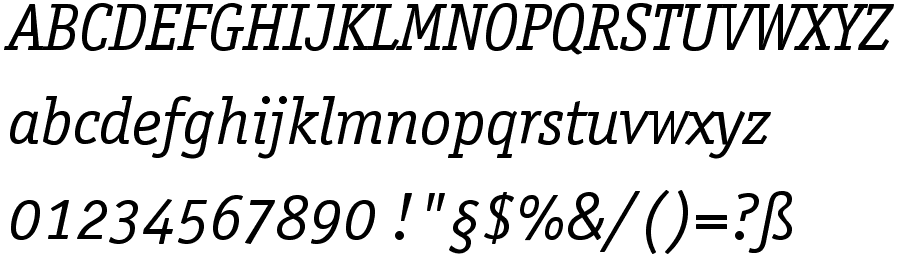
ITC Officina Serif Italic

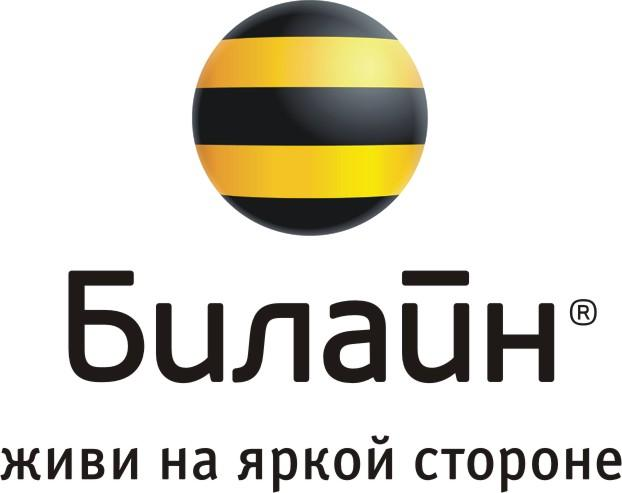
Typeface in Beeline

ITC Officina is a font superfamily designed by Erik Spiekermann and released in 1990. It consists of ITC Officina Sans, ITC Officina Serif and ITC Officina Display, with bold, italic, and small-caps variations of each.

== Sources ==
- Typedia
