= Petr van Blokland =

Dutch typographer

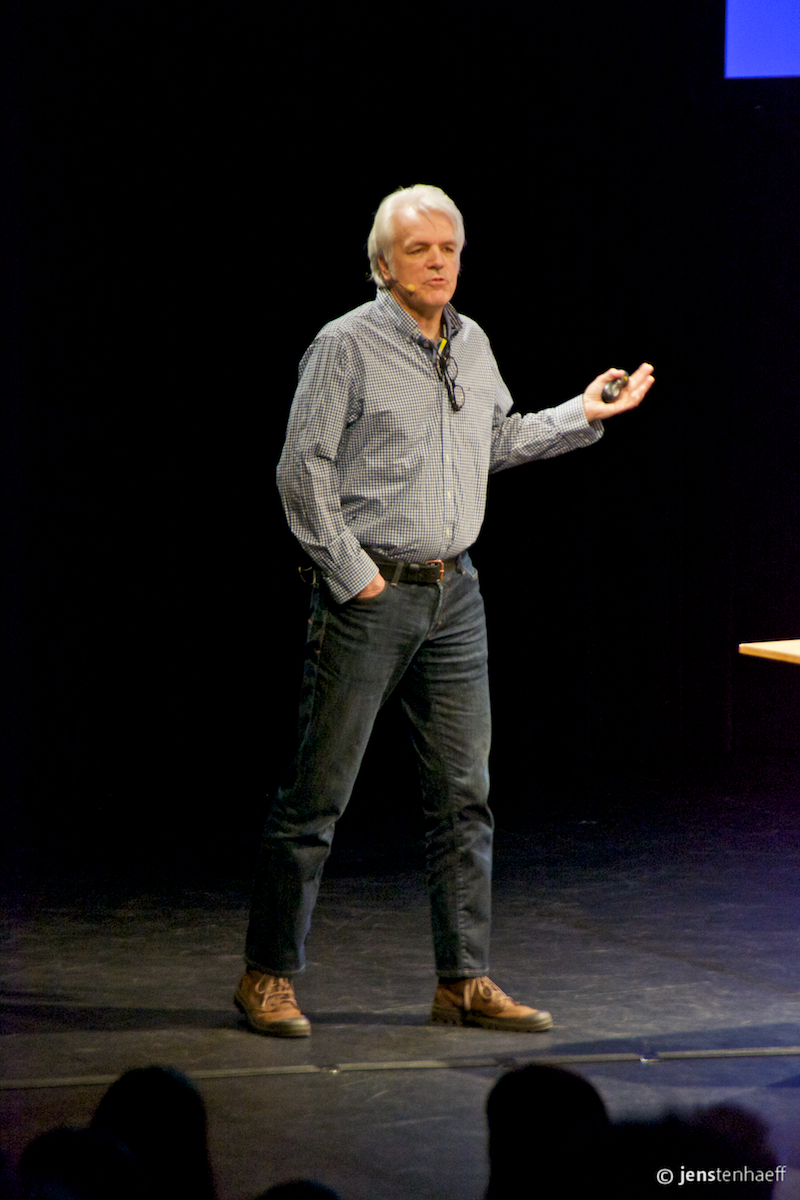
Petr van Blokland at TYPO Berlin in 2014.

Petr van Blokland (born 1956, Gouda) is a Dutch graphic designer, software author and typeface designer who lives in Delft.

== Contributions to typeface technology ==
He has made numerous important contributions to the adoption of software in typeface design. He was a co-author of Ikarus M, the first typeface design software for Macintosh computers. Alongside his brother Erik van Blokland and Just van Rossum, he created RoboFOG, a system for writing scripts to streamline typeface design work in then market-dominating type design software Fontographer. RoboFOG (and its successor RoboFAB) spearheaded a technological revolution in type design revolving around the core technologies of RoboFOG, that is Python programming, the programming assets created with the software, and the ethos that the small group evangelised, "build your own tools". A technological movement began around this, revolving around the Type and Media masters course that the three all teach at. Petr co-founded TypeNetwork, an online typeface marketplace, with Font Bureau, David Berlow, Roger Black and others, with the intention of creating a new model for type design, development and licensing.

== Typeface design ==
Blokland has authored a number of typefaces, the most notable being the influential Proforma and its sibling Productus. Proforma, an oldstyle-serif typeface, started out as a commissioned typeface for Danish digital typesetting company Purup Electronics. FontShop International, while creating its 100 best typefaces of all time list described it as "groundbreaking at the time for the way that it combined economy of space with good readability". The impact of the Proforma design was such that in 1988 Petr received the infrequently-awarded Prix Charles Peignot for distinguished typographic achievement by a designer under 35. The companion sans-serif typeface, Productus, was published by Font Bureau in 2000.
