= Adobe Font Development Kit for OpenType =

Font development kit made by Adobe

The Adobe Font Development Kit for OpenType, also known as Adobe FDKO or simply AFDKO, is a font development kit (FDK), a set of command-line tools freely distributed by Adobe for editing and verifying OpenType fonts. It does not offer a glyph editor, but focuses on tools for manipulating font metrics, kerning and other OpenType features. AFDKO runs on Microsoft Windows, Linux and macOS, and licensed under the Apache License.
