= FontLab =

Font editor

- Stable release: 8.4.2.8950 / 25 September 2024; 2 years ago
- Operating system: Windows, macOS
- Website: fontlab.com

FontLab is a font editor developed by Fontlab Ltd. FontLab is available for Windows and macOS.

== History ==
The software was initially developed by the company SoftUnion Ltd. of Saint Petersburg, Russia, under lead programmer Yuri Yarmola. In 1992, Pyrus North America Ltd. was formed in the United States to distribute and market FontLab 2.0 for Microsoft Windows, which was released in 1993. Pyrus North America eventually bought all the rights to FontLab, hired Yarmola, and then restructured as Fontlab Ltd., Inc. The company is distributed, but programming is still done primarily by a Russian team, partly in St. Petersburg, while the company is incorporated in Panama.

FontLab's first macOS product was FontLab 3 for Mac, which was released in 1998. FontLab Studio 5 was the first issued for both Mac and Windows. Although initially Windows versions always came first, the two versions have been released simultaneously since the release of FontLab 6 (VI).

Additionally, FontLab has developed spinoff font editors for specific markets. TypeTool, a simplified version of FontLab Studio, is designed as a budget, entry-level typeface editor, which serves basic features for small projects. In the past, AsiaFont Studio (or Fontlab Composer) was a more sophisticated version of Fontlab, with features for editing Chinese, Japanese, and Korean fonts. FontLab Studio has included these functions since version 5.1. OpenType features for complex scripts like Arabic, Devanagari, and Thai are not directly supported but can be added through Microsoft’s Volt.

FontLab also created a line of font creation and conversion utilities for its formerly decentralised font app system at the time. ScanFont, a tool for converting scans and bitmaps of glyphs into vector glyphs, was part of FontLab 2, but in the next version, it was split off and became a stand-alone application. With the release of FontLab VI, the ScanFont functionality was again integrated into the main application.

Next came TransType, a font converter for moving fonts between TrueType, OpenType, and Type 1 formats and between Macintosh and Windows platforms. A few shorter-lived and more specialized font converters followed: FONmaker, for converting vector fonts into bitmaps; FontFlasher, for converting “normal” vector fonts into pixelated vector fonts for low-resolution display in Flash apps; and FogLamp, for converting native Fontographer files into modern formats. (Newer versions of FontLab Studio, FontLab VI, and FontLab 7 can now open recent Fontographer files directly.)

Fontographer by Altsys, another independent font development tool, ceased development after its acquisition by Macromedia. During Macromedia's acquisition by Adobe Systems in 2005, Macromedia sold Fontographer's rights and code to FontLab Ltd.

== Release history ==
- FontLab 8: 26 June 2022 (Mac and Windows)
- FontLab 7: 30 November 2019 (Mac and Windows)
- FontLab VI: 8 December 2017 (Mac and Windows)
- TypeTool 3: 28 March 2007 (Mac and Windows)
- FontLab Studio 5: 12 December 2005 (Mac), Nov 2005 (Windows)
- FontLab 4: 3 December 2001 (Windows)
- FontLab 3: 1 June 1998 (Windows), 1 April 1999 (Mac)
- TypeTool: 8 August 1997 (Windows)

== Deprecated and discontinued products ==
- AsiaFont Studio (formerly FontLab Composer)—a font editor for professional typeface designers of CJK fonts or other fonts with exceptionally large glyph counts. Its functions were rolled into FontLab Studio 5.1 and later.
- Photofont—a technology/format for creating bitmap fonts with color, texture and transparency and using them in page layout and website design
- SigMaker—a simple utility for adding a single character to a TrueType font
- FONmaker—a font converter that makes bitmap fonts from TrueType fonts
- FontFlasher—a font converter that optimizes fonts for display at small sizes and low resolution
- FogLamp—a font converter that converts Fontographer .fog files into several different modern formats

== See also ==
- Comparison of font editors
