= Gerrit Noordzij =

Dutch typographer (1931–2022)

- Born: 2 April 1931; Rotterdam, Netherlands
- Died: 17 March 2022 (aged 90); Meppel, Netherlands

Gerrit Noordzij (2 April 1931 – 17 March 2022) was a Dutch typographer, typeface designer, and author. He started teaching letters and calligraphy at the Royal Academy of Art in The Hague in 1960. Motivated to make type accessible to his students, he identified the stroke of the pen as the central idea in the making of letter forms. What began as a method to make his students into better graphic designers grew, in various iterations and publications, into a comprehensive approach to type design. The contrast cube became an iconic model of his ideas. Noordzij recognised the possibilities of the computer in type design early on. He encouraged his students to not only study the pens and their shapes, but also adopt a critical view on making digital tools (and doing the math). By the time Noordzij retired in 1990, his methods were in use in type classes and workshops all over the world. His book The Stroke has been translated in (amongst others) English, German, French, Italian, Spanish, Portuguese, Korean, Croatian and Russian. And of course, it has been the practical and theoretical foundation of the KABK TypeMedia master for over twenty years.

== Career ==
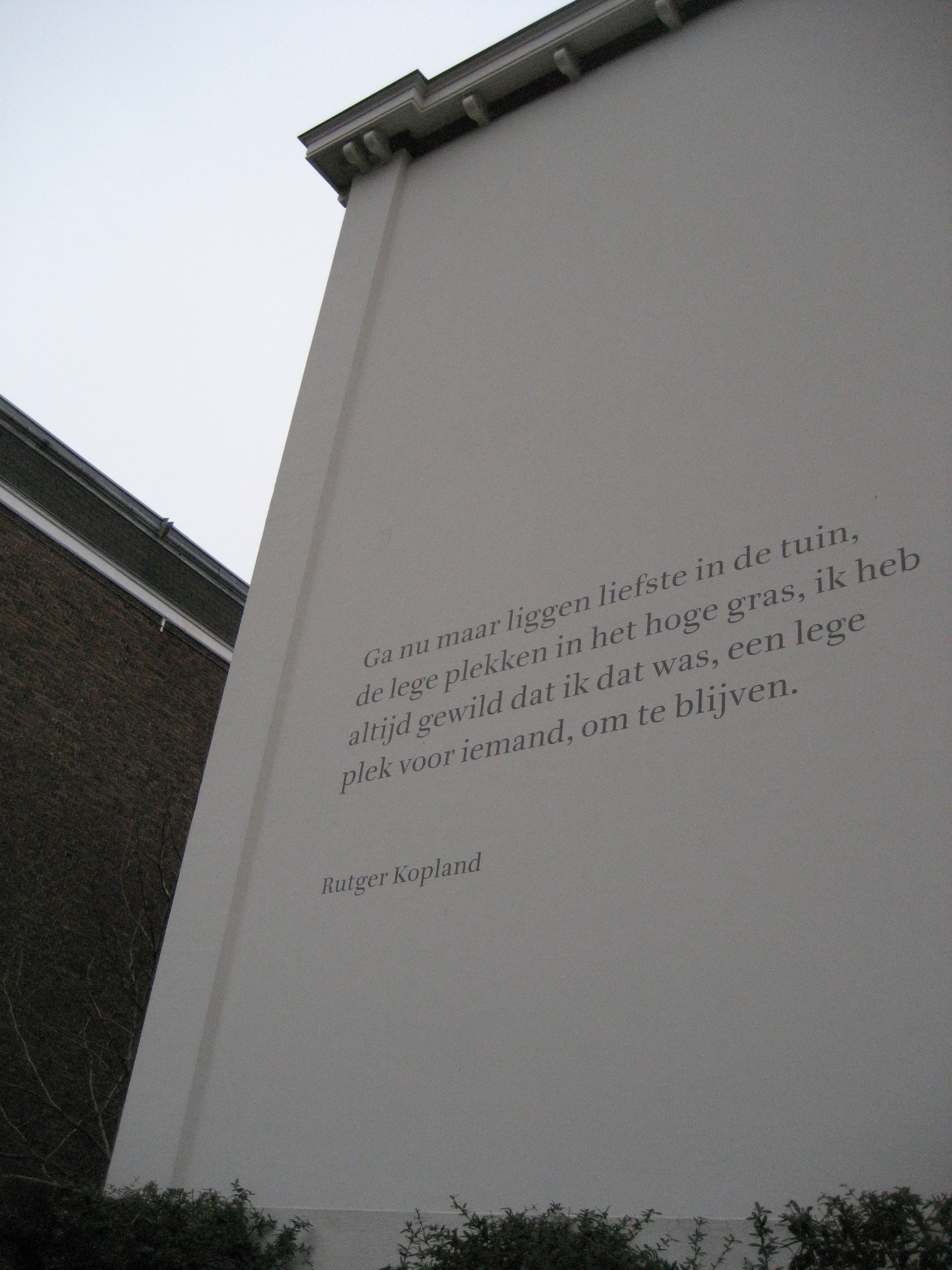
Wall poem by Rutger Kopland in The Hague. Font: Ruse by Gerrit Noordzij

Gerrit Noordzij began his career as a graphic designer and as a bookbinder's apprentice. Since then he has designed and authored dozens of books on typography and design. He also made drawings, wood engravings, copper engravings, and inscriptions in stone and glass. In 1956 he was hired by the Amsterdam publishing house Querido, where he worked for two years designing many books and book covers. Most of the books published by Uitgeverij van Oorschot from 1978 onwards were also designed by Noordzij, and many of his type designs originated when designing these book covers. He has even written computer programs for Canon. Noordzij wrote and edited Letterletter, a journal in English for ATypI on the subject of typography.

From 1960 to 1990, Noordzij was a professor of typeface design at the Royal Academy of Fine Arts in The Hague, Netherlands. From 1970 to his retirement in 1990, he was the director of the writing and lettering programme at the graphic design department.

== The stroke of the pen ==
Noordzij introduced his own method of teaching typography and type design at the Royal Academy of Art, based on his theoretical system ′The stroke of the pen′. He presented this system in a booklet called The stroke of the pen: fundamental aspects of western writing (1982), and further developed it in the Dutch booklet De Streek: Theorie van het schrift (1985) (which was translated to English in 2005, called The Stroke: Theory of Writing). Even though this theoretical model mostly concerns the written word, Noordzij applies it to printed type as well, as he defines typography as ′writing with prefabricated characters′. It is an analysis of the construction of letterforms, describing how most printing typefaces have their roots in handwriting (i.e. broad-nib pen, pointed pen). The method of teaching type design at the Royal Academy is still largely based on Noordzij's theoretical model today, as several of his former students are now the professors at the department.

== Awards ==
The Gerrit Noordzij Prize, a prize given to typographers and type designers for extraordinary contributions to the field, is named after him. He was also the first person to receive this prize in 1996.

He also received the Laurens Janszoon Costerprijs in 2011.

== Publications ==
- The Stroke of The Pen: fundamental aspects of western writing, Koninklijke Academie van Beeldende Kunsten, The Hague (1982)
- Das Kind und die Schrift, Typographische Gesellschaft, Munich (1985)
- De Streek: Theorie van het schrift, Van de Garde, Zaltbommel (1985, also published by Uitgeverij ICS Nederland B.V. in 1991)
- De staart van de kat: de vorm van het boek in opstellen, GHM, Leersum (1988)
- Letterletter (newsletters combined and reissued in book form in 2000)
- De handen van de zeven zusters, Van Oorschot, Amsterdam (2001)
- The Stroke: Theory of Writing, Hyphen Press, London (published in Dutch in 1985, translated into English by Peter Enneson in 2005)
- Gewone letters Gerrit's early models, / (authors: Albert-Jan Pool, Frank Blokland, Aad van Dommelen, Huug Schipper, Petr van Blokland; initiative: Geen Bitter), Publisher de Buitenkant, Amsterdam, 2013, ISBN 978-94-90-9133-97

This is only a selection of his publications.
