= Peter Karow =

German-Polish entrepreneur

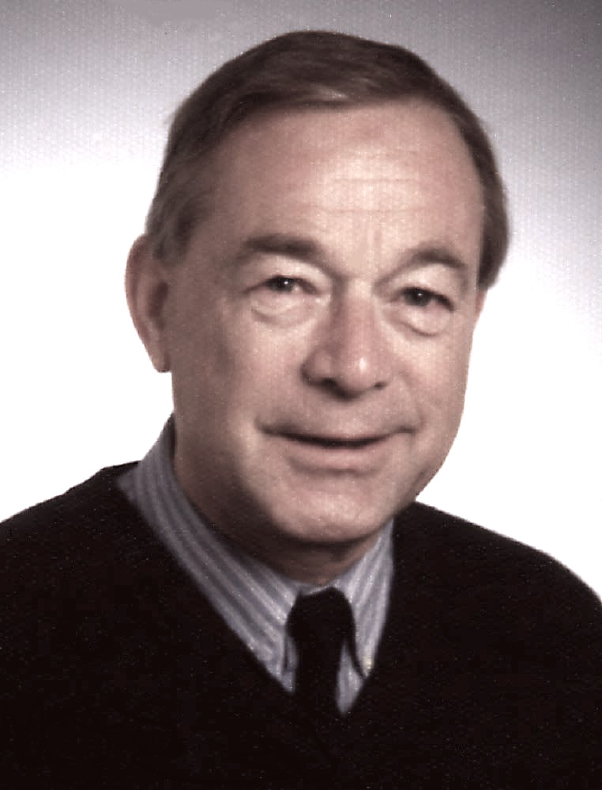
- Portrait of Karow, 2013
- Born: November 11, 1940; Stargard in Pommern, Gau Pomerania, Nazi Germany
- Education: University of Hamburg

Peter Karow (born 11 November 1940) is a German entrepreneur, inventor and software developer. He holds several patents in the field of desktop publishing and is known for his work on computer fonts. He contributed with several books and patents to the development of operating systems for computers. He is recognized as the inventor of outline computer fonts.

== Career ==
Born in Stargard in Pommern, after graduating from high school in 1960 in Schöningen near Braunschweig, Karow enrolled at the University of Hamburg to study physics. He married in 1969 and has two children. After receiving his PhD in 1971, he co-founded the company URW Software & Type GmbH in Hamburg. In 1975, his Ikarus (typography software) was introduced to members of Association Typographique Internationale in Warsaw. Afterwards, Ikarus was used all over the world for the digitization of fonts. Between 1975 and 1995, URW digitized a large amount of fonts for companies such as IBM, Siemens, Microsoft, Apple Inc., Adobe, Linotype, Monotype, Rudolf Hell and numerous Japanese companies.

== Contributions ==
=== Digitization of outlines for typefaces (1972) with Ikarus ===
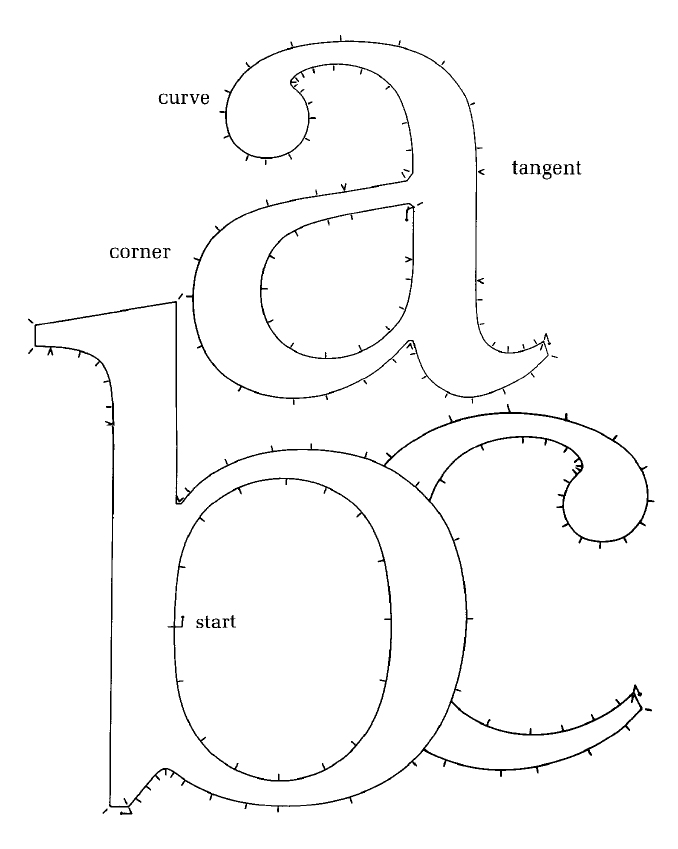
Ikarus outlines

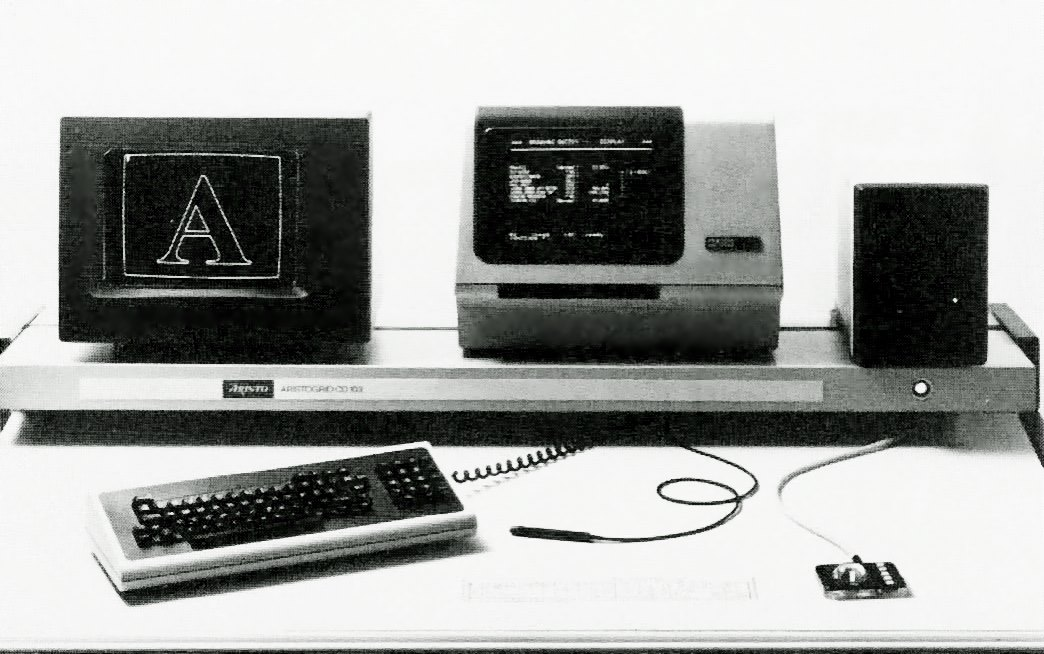
Digitizer 1972

Printouts of single characters in a height of approximately 10 cm were digitized on a digitizer tablet of Aristo along their outlines, marking various points of support (beginning, corner, tangent and curve) with an accuracy of 1/100 mm. This invention together with a newly developed structure for storing and encoding single characters inside a font made characters, but also any other graphical signs freely scalable for the computer and available for other mathematical operations.

=== Calculation of the first typeface variations (1973) ===
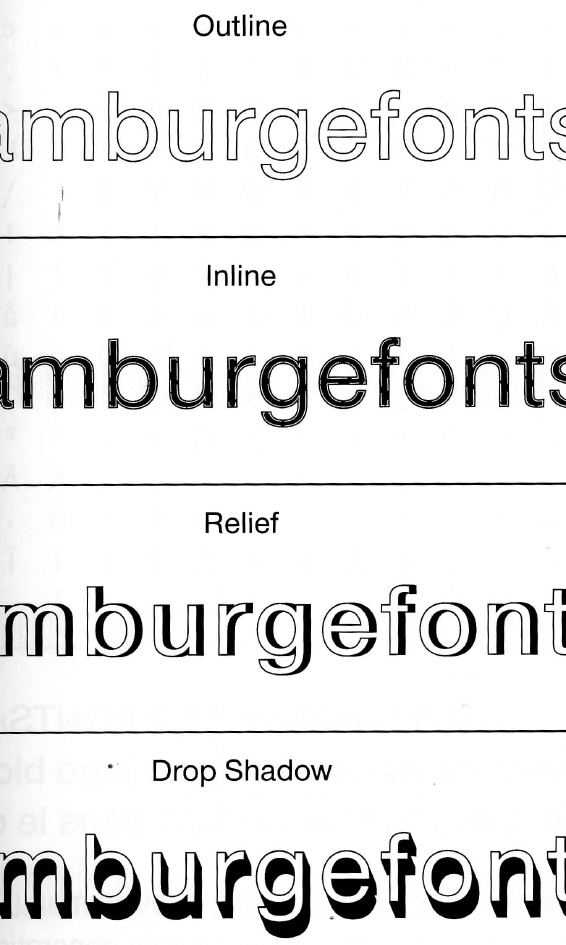
Computer calculated variations 1973

After the output for plotters was programmed successfully - to make possible comparing digital output and original -, more software was developed to calculate first variations of fonts, for example italic, outlined and shaded typefaces.

=== Interpolation of typefaces (1973) ===
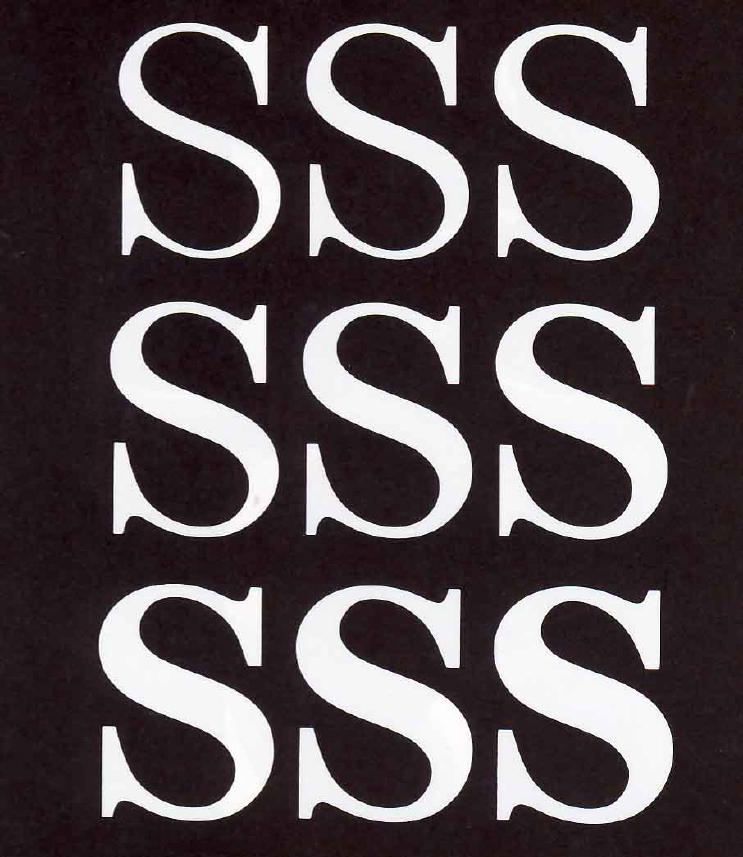
Interpolation of typefaces

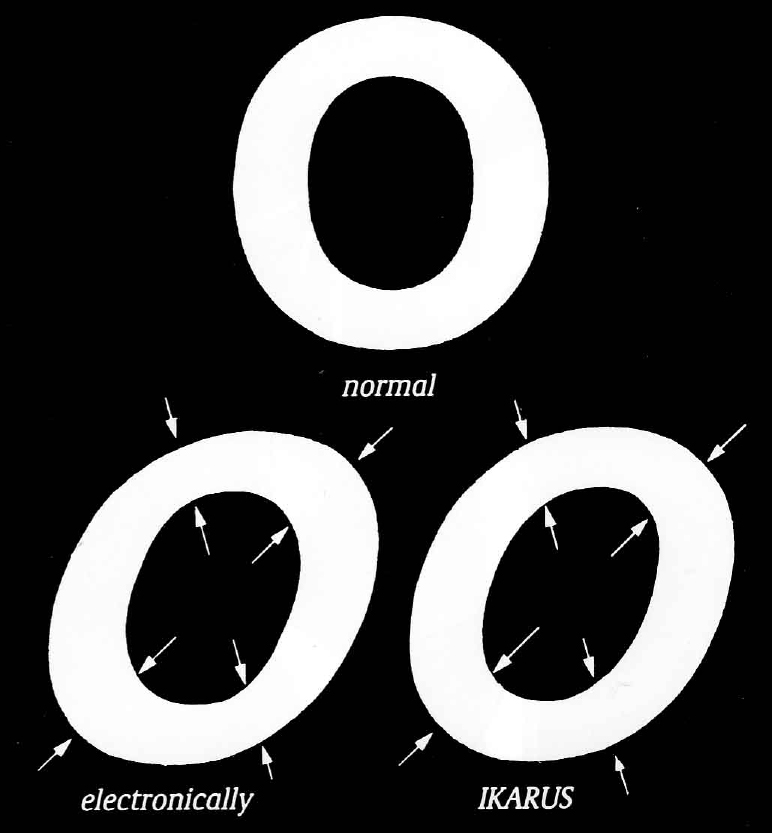
automatic correction of electronic slanting

Software that enables to calculate interpolations and extrapolations between one light and one bold font version was than added and made it possible to create fonts such as ultra-light, semi-bold and extra bold variations. This invention drastically reduced time and effort for font manufacturers to create these intermediate fonts and was frequently used, particularly in Japan.

=== Text embroidery (1975) ===
In 1975, Peter Karow invented a software program for the company Gunold in Stockstadt, Germany, that made automatic stitching of embroidered text possible worldwide for the first time.

=== Calculation of bitmap fonts (rasterizing 1975) ===
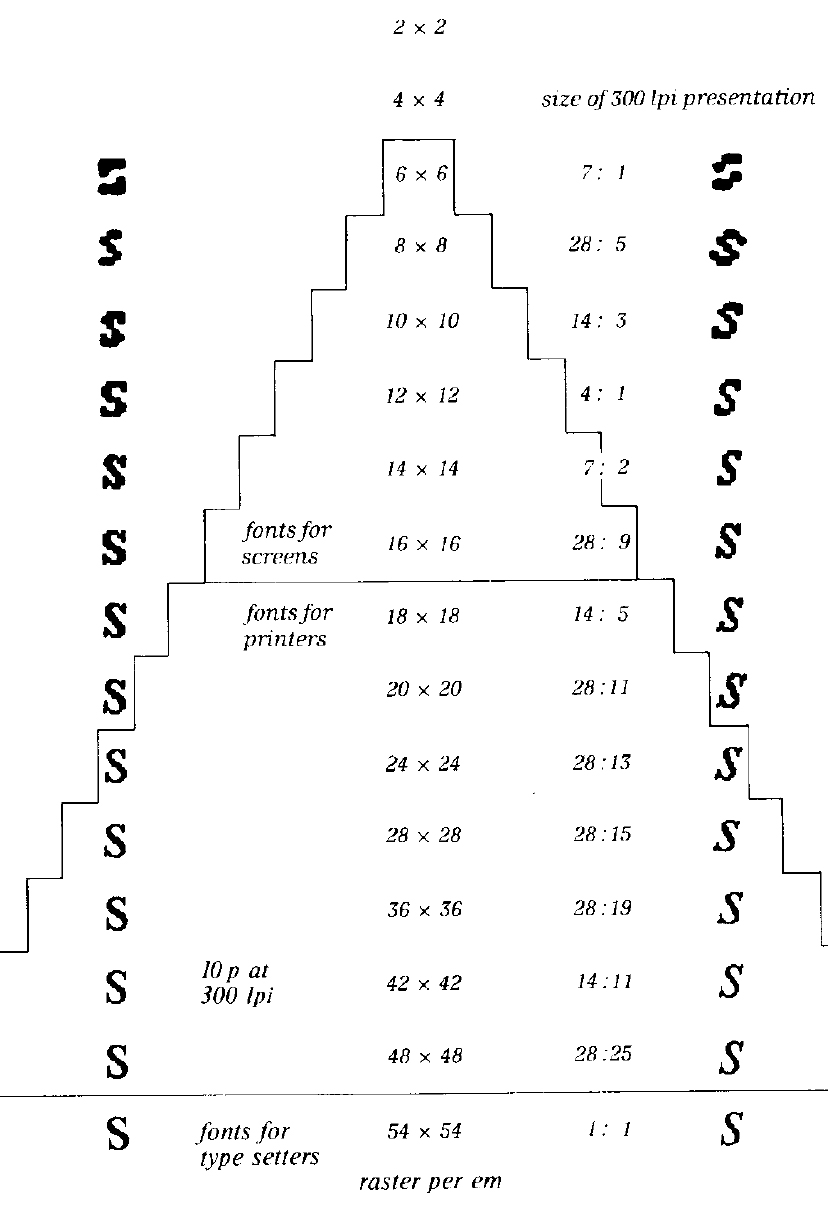
calculation of bitmap fonts

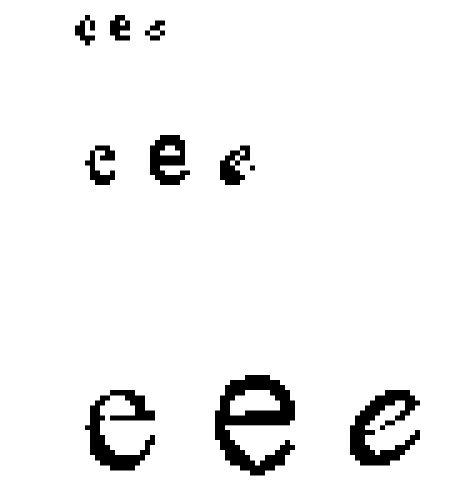
Distortions through random rasterization

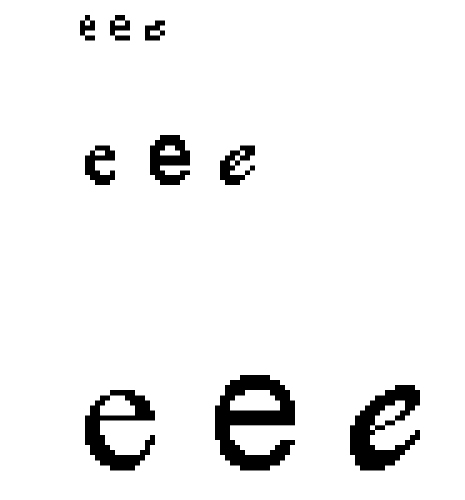
Controlled and optimal rasterization

In order to display characters by means of electronic devices such as electronic typesetters, dot matrix or laser printers and particularly computer monitors, a fast calculation of bitmaps in any size (resolution) is crucial. In 1965, Dr. Rudolf Hell invented the Digiset, the first electronic typesetter. In 1970, Xerox put into operation the first small laser printer, and three years later the first PC was developed with a graphical user interface that used a bitmap memory for the creation of the video signal.

=== Character hinting (1975) ===
Peter Karow realized very quickly that - in the case of coarse resolutions -the mere calculation of bitmaps led to images of letters that appeared distorted through random rasterization. In order to prevent these effects, he invented additional information for letter characteristics such as vertical and horizontal linear or curved strokes or serifs and their classification with regard to upper and lower case letters. This facilitated the creation of improved bitmaps that could then be used as bitmap fonts for dot matrix and laser printers or electronic typesetters. In 1985, based on this concept, John Warnock and Bill Caxton from Adobe developed “Hinting on the Fly” for PostScript fonts. This enabled the use of generally available fonts on any computer, printer and typesetter. In 1988, Peter Karow worked as an advisor for Apple Inc. during the development of hinting for TrueType fonts. In 1992, this method of font storage was adopted by Microsoft. Five years later both font storage technologies were combined as OpenType.

=== Character pair kerning (1981) ===
From 1981 to 1991, together with Margret Albrecht from Hamburg, Peter Karow devoted himself to the automation of kerning, i.e. the calculation of kerning values for the improvement of typesetting. These values had previously been determined empirically by font designers.

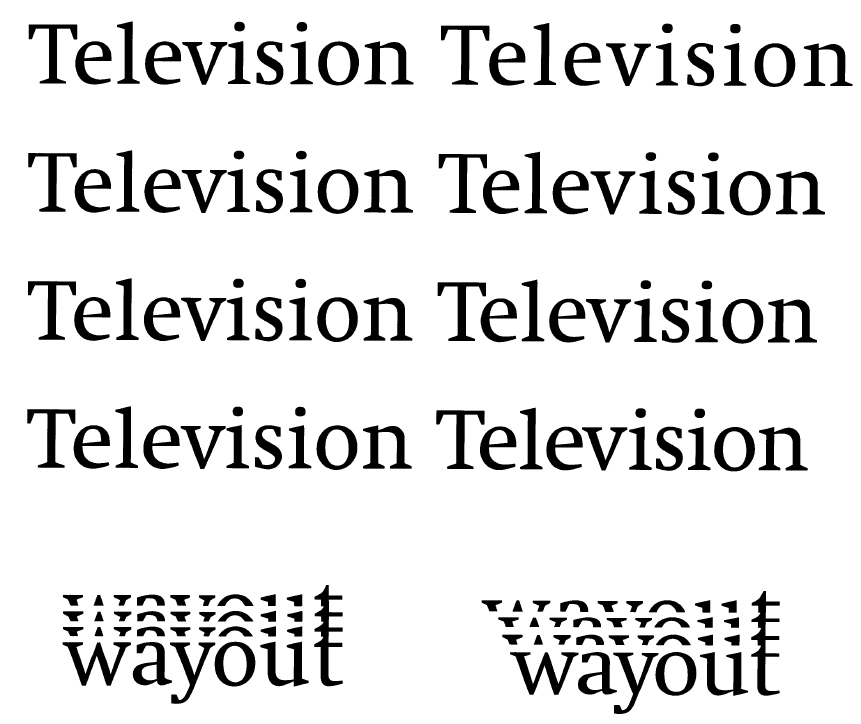
Left with / right without kerning

=== Character grayscaling (1981) ===
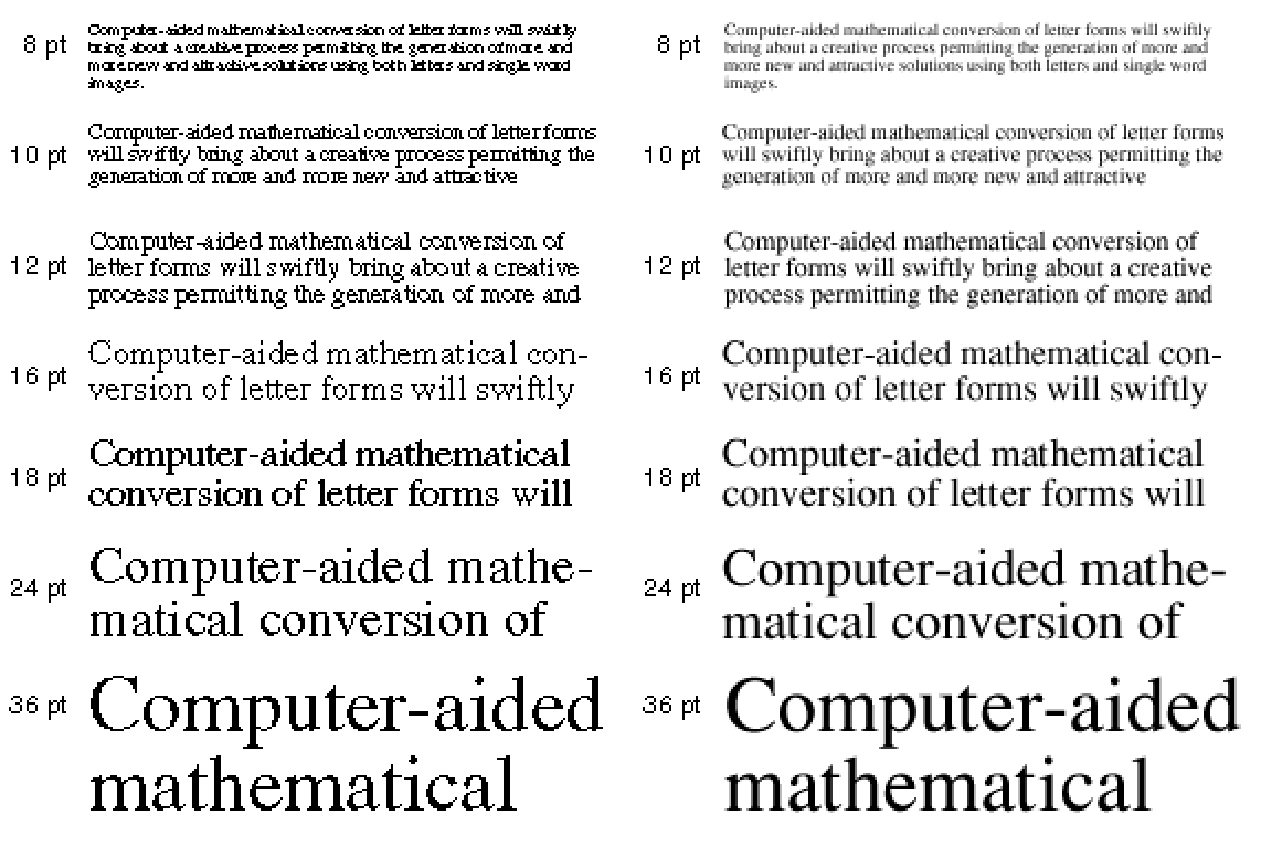
Left without / right with grayscaling

Initially, the graphical user interfaces on monitors were black and white, and consequently the display of small type sizes was very poor due to jagged edges. Peter Karow tried to find an inexpensive solution to enhance the display by means of using grayscale instead of just black and white, but this solution did not immediately gain acceptance. As late as 1995, Adobe took his advice and then used grayscale in its Adobe Acrobat program for the display of texts on monitors. Today, all characters displayed on screens use grayscale for smoothing the edges.

=== Signus system (1983) ===
In 1983, the Ikarus Program evolved into the Signus System, a system that makes it possible to cut text, logos and other signs into self-adhesive foil for outdoor advertising. Today, this signage technology is referred to as "computer writing".

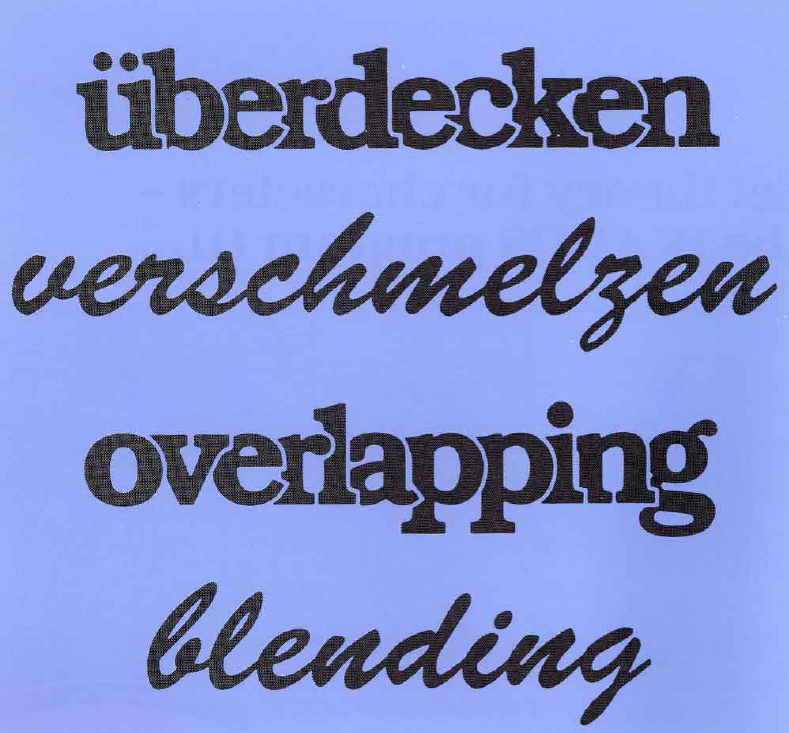
Writing with the Signus system

=== Optical scaling of fonts (1991) ===
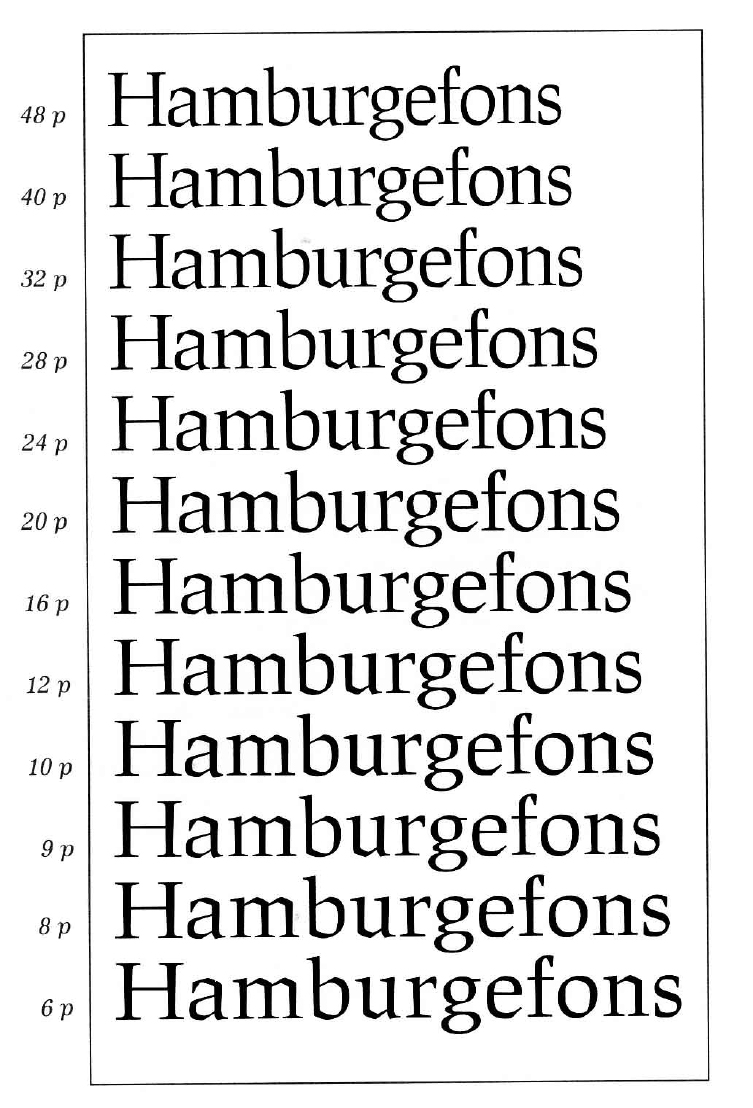
Individual scaling per point size

Hot metal typesetting in earlier times used the so-called optical scaling, when fonts were cut bolder and wider with decreasing point size. With analogue calculations Peter Karow made it possible to automatically adjust the fonts to certain point sizes. Nowadays, however, this technique is not often used.

=== Element separation of Kanji characters (1992) ===
The Japanese company Fujitsu hired Peter Karow and Jürgen Willrodt from Hamburg to develop a method that would automatically break down Kanji characters into single elements. This method made it possible to store the Kanji font using only 20% of the previously needed storage space without any loss of quality after reassembling the elements.

=== Paragraph justification (1992) ===
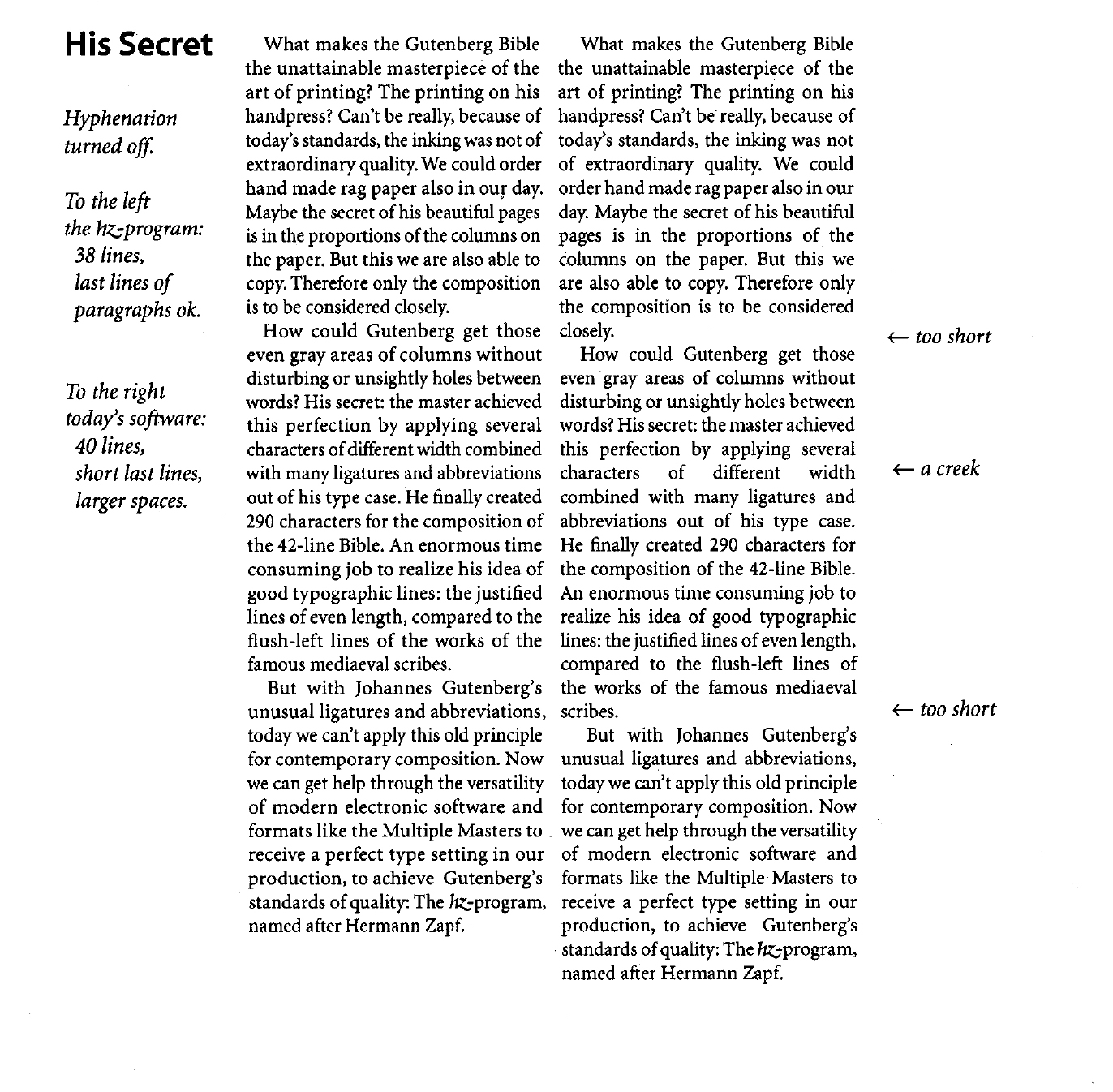
Paragraph justification with the Hz program

In 1992, Peter Karow developed the Hz-program, the automation of the paragraph justification, together with the well-known typographer Hermann Zapf and Margret Albrecht. The optimization of the paragraph justification was implemented using an algorithm developed by Donald Knuth along with automated kerning and optical scaling. In 1995, the underlying ideas and algorithms were passed along to the company Adobe, which incorporated them into their program InDesign.

=== Chapter justification (1995) ===
Analogous to the development of the paragraph justification, Peter Karow and Margret Albrecht started working on an automated chapter justification. They succeeded in having each chapter of a book always start on a right page (recto) and end on a left page (verso) while avoiding widow lines and orphan lines. In 1996, a patent application was filed for this method at the company of Adobe, which has yet to be used in any typesetting program.

=== AdCyclopedia (1999) ===
On behalf of the company AdVision digital GmbH in Hamburg, Peter Karow developed the AdCyclopedia, a database for current and historic ads in newspapers, magazines, TV, internet, billboards, movies and emails. In 1999, the GWA headquarters (German Association of Communication Agencies) entered into a cooperation with the company AdVision digital GmbH in order to provide its members and their customers with an effective competitor monitoring tool on the internet. Today, the AdCyclopedia is extended to monitor spendings for advertising (budgets) per product, brand, company, country, and period.

== Awards ==
- 2003: Dr. Peter Karow award for Font Technology & Digital Typography of the Dutch Type Library (DTL)

== Publications ==
- Digital Typefaces. Springer-Verlag, Berlin Heidelberg New York London Paris Tokyo, 1994, ISBN 3-540-56509-4
- Font Technology. Springer-Verlag, Berlin Heidelberg New York London Paris Tokyo, 1994, ISBN 3-540-57223-6
- Typeface Statistics. URW Verlag, Hamburg, 1993, ISBN 3-926515-08-2
- PrintWorks. URW Verlag, Hamburg, 1994, ISBN 3-926515-13-9
- EuroWorks. URW Verlag, Hamburg, 1994, ISBN 3-926515-11-2
- Шрифтовые технологии. Описание и инструментарий. Издательство «Мир», Moscow, 2001, ISBN 5-03-003360-2
