= Erik Spiekermann =

German typographer, designer and writer (born 1947)

- Erik Spiekermann
- Born: May 30, 1947 (age 79); Stadthagen
- Occupations: typographer, designer and writer

Erik Spiekermann (born 30 May 1947) is a German art historian, typographer, designer, information architect and writer. He divides his time between Berlin, London and San Francisco. He runs Hacking Gutenberg, an experimental letterpress printing workshop in Berlin.

== Early life and education ==
Spiekermann studied art history at the Free University of Berlin, funding himself by running a letterpress printing press in the basement of his house.

== Career ==
In 1989, Spiekermann co-founded FontShop with Joan Spiekermann. The company was an early mail-order distributor of computer fonts.

Spiekermann left MetaDesign in 2001 and set up United Designers Network with his wife Susanna Dulkinys. The practice later became SpiekermannPartners and, following a 2009 merger with Eden Design & Communication, operated as Edenspiekermann.

He participated in the creation of corporate identities and other works, including redesigns of the publications The Economist and Reason.

Spiekermann is an honorary professor at the University of the Arts Bremen. He received the Gerrit Noordzij Prize from the Royal Academy of Art, The Hague and an honorary doctorate from ArtCenter College of Design, United States of America. In 2007, the Royal Society of Arts named him an Honorary Royal Designer for Industry.

In 2020 Spiekermann set up TOC Publishing.

He appeared in the 2007 documentary film Helvetica.

== Typefaces ==
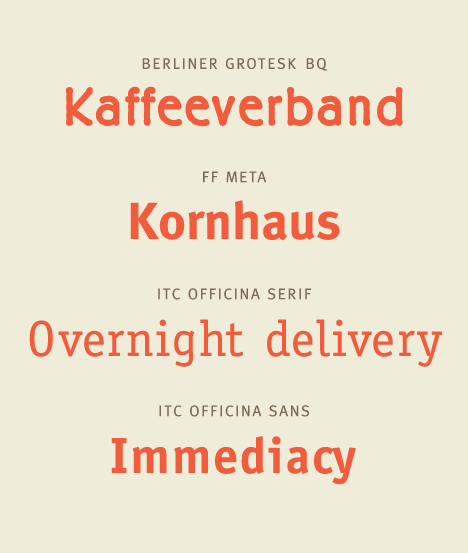
Specimens of typefaces by Erik Spiekermann

Spiekermann has designed typefaces, both for sale and as part of corporate design programmes. His typefaces include:

- Artz
- Axel (with Erik van Blokland and Ralph Du Carrois)
- Berliner Grotesk (original is from 1913, digitization is from c. 1978)
- Boehringer Antiqua and Boehringer Sans (with Ole Schäfer)
- Bosch Sans and Serif (with Christian Schwartz) * Case, Case Text, Case Micro (with Anja Meiners and Ralph du Carrois, 2020) * Cisco (with Ralph Du Carrois)
- DB Type
- Economist (2000, with Ole Schäfer)
- Explo Stencil (with Ralph du Carrois)
- Fira Sans (designed in collaboration with Ralph du Carrois) for Firefox OS, released in 2013 under the SIL Open Font License)
- Gravis Hybrid (with Susanna Dulkinys and Julia Sysmaläinen)
- FF Govan (2001)
- FF Info (2000)
- Heidelberg Gothic
- Infoscreen
- Messe Univers
- FF Meta (1991–1998)
- FF Meta Serif (with Christian Schwartz and Kris Sowersby, 2007)
- neue Serie57
- Lo-Type (original is from 1911/14, digitization is from 1980)
- ITC Officina Sans (1990)
- ITC Officina Serif (1990)
- Nokia Sans (2002–2011, corporate typeface for Nokia and the default UI font for Symbian S60 smartphones)
- ITC Officina Sans and Serif (1988, with Just van Rossum and Ole Schäfer) * FF Real (with Anja Meiners and Ralph du Carrois, 2011)
- Tern (with Ralph du Carrois)
- FF Transit (with Henning Krause and Lucas de Groot)
- FF Unit (2003)
- FF Unit Slab (with Christian Schwartz and Kris Sowersby, 2009)
- ZDF News (with Susanna Dulkinys, Ralph Du Carrois and Julia Sysmaläinen)

== Writing ==
- Stop Stealing Sheep & Find Out How Type Works, a book on typography first published in 1993, revised 4th edition 2023, ISBN 978-3-949164-03-3

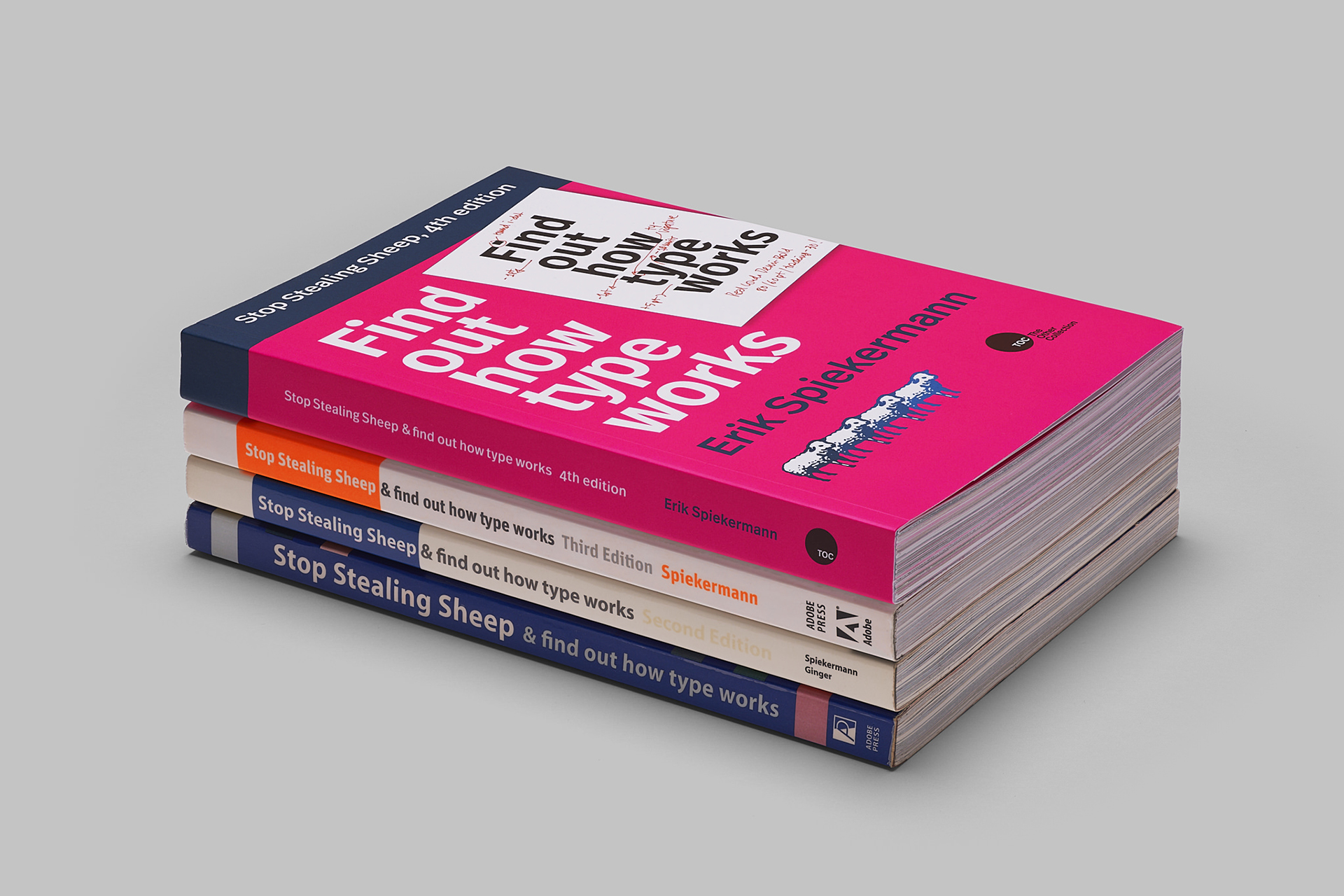
Find out how type works

== Awards ==
- 2004 – Gerrit Noordzij Prize
- 2006 – German Design Award
- 2007 – European Design Awards Hall of Fame 2007 – Honorary Royal Designer for Industry, Royal Society for the encouragement of Arts, Manufactures & Commerce, London
- 2011 – Lifetime achievement award from German Design Prize
- 2011 – TCD Medal Lifetime Award
- 2026 – Gutenberg Preis der Stadt Mainz

== See also ==
- First Things First 2000 manifesto
