= Les Usherwood =

Typographer and typeface designer

- Born: England
- Died: 1983 (aged 50–51)
- Occupation: Lettering artist

Les Usherwood was born in England, studied in Kent and started his career as a lettering artist. He moved to Toronto, Ontario, Canada in 1957 and worked for various companies until he started Typsettra with David Thomason in 1968. The company supplied typographic layouts, headline (on Typositor) and text typesetting (on Berthold Diatronic), mechanicals, custom lettering and notably typeface design.

Typsettra did work for many important designers and art directors. In his role as a Type Director, Usherwood help create the unique style of detailed ‘jigsaw’ layout typography typified by tightly spaced custom headline faces, long text with many run-arounds. There is a clear comparison to the work of Herb Lubalin, Ed Benguiat, and U&lc magazine.

His untimely death in 1983 at 51, at the height of his career, was a shock. The Advertising & Design Club of Canada uses his name for their annual lifetime achievement award for which he was the first recipient.

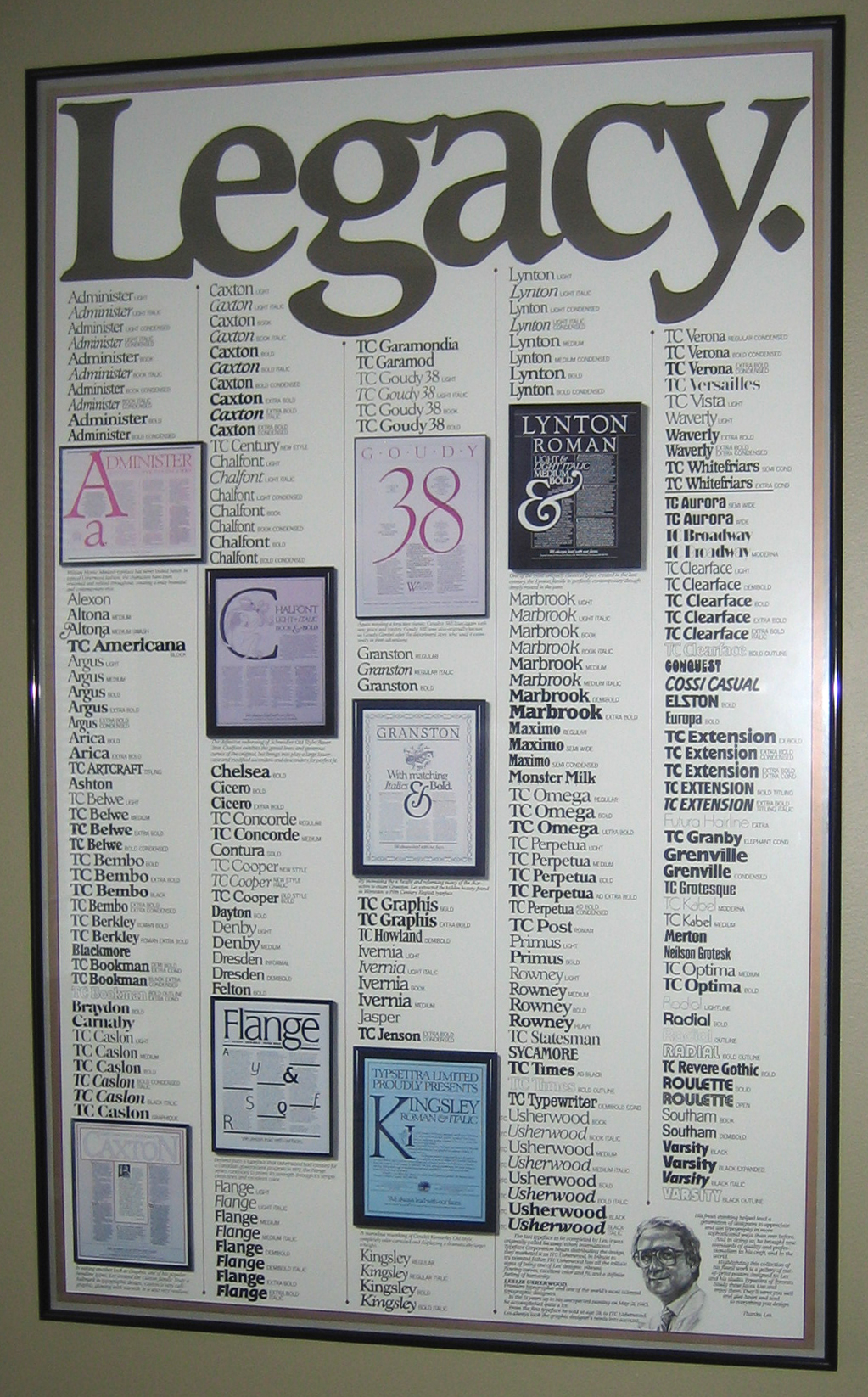
Les Usherwood Legacy Typeface Poster

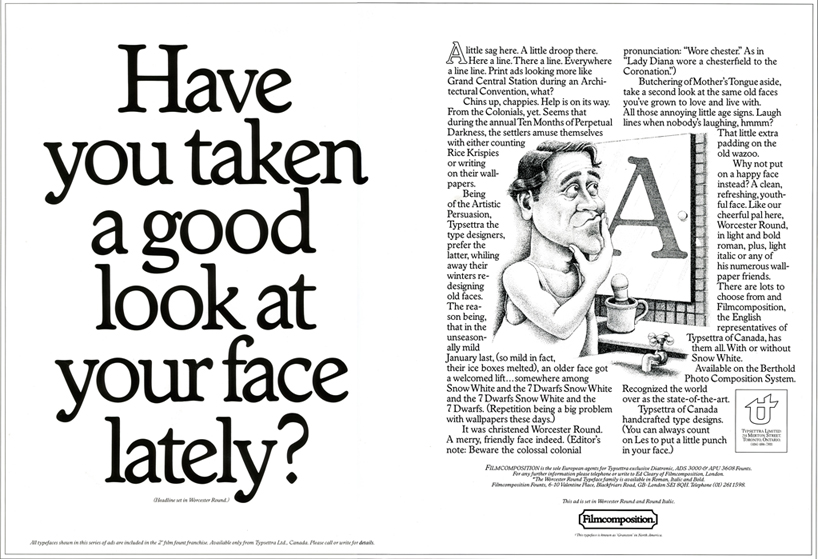
Typsettra Advert "Have you taken" etc. Les Usherwood

== Typeface designs ==
Les Usherwood was a prolific typeface designer creating over 200 faces for a variety uses and clients. His typefaces include Administer, Caxton (for Letraset), Flange (for Berthold), Kingsley, ITC (International Typeface Corporation) Leawood, and ITC Usherwood.

== Bibliography ==
- Macmillan, Neil. An A-Z of Type Designers. London: Laurence King, 2006
- Warburton, Matt. Typsettra Recollections. Graphic Design Journal 6 (19XX): 2-8
- Mason, Dennis. Les Usherwood – A Legacy. Studio Magazine, Vol. 4 No. 1 (1986): 6-9
- Les Usherwood, a tribute. Etc. Summer, Lettraset, Canada, 1984: 3-5.
- Taylor, Kate. "Les Usherwood: Canada’s Greatest Type Designer." Applied Arts Quarterly. Autumn 1990. 59-62, 66, 68
- Toronto’s Design Pioneers. Communication Designers of Toronto (Cdot). Toronto: Winter 2008. 46-7
