= Fontographer =

Font editor

- Developers: Altsys (1986–1995); Macromedia (1995–2005); FontLab (2005–)
- Stable release: 5.2.3 / 27 December 2013; 12 years ago
- Operating system: Windows, macOS
- Platform: IA-32, x64
- Size: Windows: 8.7 MB; OS X: 19.9 MB
- Type: Font editor
- License: Trialware
- Website: www.fontlab.com/font-editor/fontographer/

Fontographer is a font editor for Windows and macOS; it is used to create digital fonts. It was originally developed by Altsys but is now owned by FontLab Ltd.

== History ==
=== Altsys Corporation ===
In December 1984, James R. Von Ehr II founded the Altsys Corporation to develop graphics applications for personal computers. The first foray by Altsys into commercial font editing software was a bitmap font editor called Fontastic, released in the mid-1980s for the Apple Macintosh. The program, developed by Altsys founder Von Ehr, was able to edit the native bitmap font format of the Mac. It introduced many of the interface elements that would carry over into Fontographer. Fontastic Plus was later introduced with new editing tools and kerning pairs.

Fontographer, developed by von Ehr for the Mac and released in January 1986 — before Adobe Illustrator — was the first commercially available Bézier curve editing software for a personal computer. High quality fonts in the PostScript format could be developed for a fraction of the cost of all other existing methods (URW's Ikarus required systems costing over $100,000), leading to what has been called "the democratization of type design": for the first time in history, numerous self-taught type designers without substantial capital investment produced fonts for professional use. Fontographer 2.0 was released eight months later in the Fall of 1986.

With the PostScript background established with Fontographer, Altsys developed FreeHand in 1988 as a Macintosh Postscript-based illustration program using Bézier curves for drawing and editing. In 1989, Fontographer 3.0 was released, featuring an auto-trace tool and automatic generation of hints for Postscript printer fonts.

=== Macromedia ===
In January 1995 Altsys was acquired by Macromedia and both Fontographer and FreeHand were incorporated into the Macromedia product lineup. A new version of Fontographer was included in the Macromedia Graphics Suite, which helped its wider adoption. Although development of the font editor was frozen from 1991, when version 4.1 was released, until 2006, many font and graphics designers continue to use it.

=== FontLab ===
In May 2005, FontLab Ltd. announced that they had licensed distribution rights from Macromedia, and resumed development. In December 2005 FontLab shipped a new version of Fontographer for Mac OS, running natively on OS X and featuring numerous bug fixes. They subsequently bought the rights to the program outright.

In June 2010, Fontographer version 5.0 was released, the first major features added to the product since 1996. FontLab positioned the product as an easier-to-use alternative to FontLab Studio without many of the high-end features needed by professional type designers, and gave it a price intermediate between FontLab Studio and their more introductory font editing program TypeTool. In the summer of 2011, Fontlab released Fontographer 5.1. As of 2023, Fontographer 5.2 is the latest release; it is compatible with Windows versions XP through 10, and as a 32-bit macOS application it is compatible with only versions 10.6 through 10.14 of the operating system.

== See also ==
- Comparison of font editors
