= Ikarus (typography software) =

Typography software

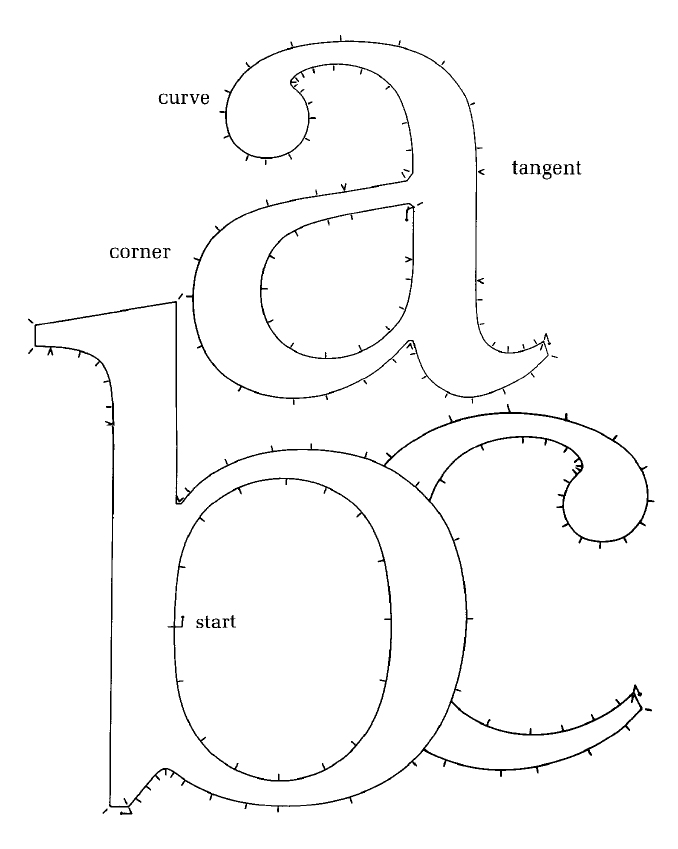
Ikarus Outline Description

Ikarus is a type design and production software developed by URW and Brendel Informatik foundries, for converting existing typefaces and logos into digital format for use on computer driven printing, plotting and sign cutting devices.

It was licensed by major foundries such as Agfa-Compugraphic, Autologic, Berthold, International Typeface Corporation, Letraset, Linotype, Monotype, Stempel, and others.

Its "IK" format was convertible into diverse vendor representations, including Type3 and Type1 PostScript formats as well as the TrueType format by Apple and Microsoft.

Ikarus uses a spline model of the outline shape of each character within a typeface to give a fully scalable representation. The curve segments are essentially circle arcs, with tangent continuity maintained at joins. It is a very simple format to mark up manually. Being a vector/curve based format, any rendering resolution can be attained (by rasterisation) with equal accuracy from one relatively small set of data. The Ikarus coordinates for a shape all fall on the outline of that shape (as opposed to Bézier curves where 'control' points can be inside or outside the outline).

The functionality of Ikarus can be expanded using plug-ins.

== History ==
Originally invented by URW employee Dr Peter Karow, Ikarus (German spelling of the mythical figure Icarus) got its name from the frequency with which it crashed in the early days of its development. It was designed to run on minicomputers such as DEC VAX and later adapted to microcomputers as they became increasingly powerful. In 1975, IKARUS was introduced at ATypI in Warsaw.

By the 1980s a huge library of typefaces and logos existed as photographic film and needed to be input into computers for the latest generation of printing and sign-making devices. Unfortunately, normal scanning gives a rasterized shape at the resolution of the scanning device which leads to degradation of quality when scaling up and down. This is a particular concern in the sign making industry where individual letters may be metres across, many times the size of the original artwork. Ikarus enables a human operator to input the features of a complex shape with curves, corners and straight lines (e.g. a letter of the alphabet) to a computer which stores it as a mathematical representation, for all intents and purposes independent of the size of the original artwork and of the final output. A version of Ikarus tailored for signmaking applications was released by URW as "Signus".

The advent of desktop publishing in the 1980s using Apple Macintosh computers coupled with laser printers led to a shift away from a small number of specialized print bureaux acquiring relatively expensive fonts to a growing market for cheap mass-produced fonts. The drawback of Ikarus for catering for this new market was that, while extremely accurate, it was very labour-intensive.

After Adobe Systems started licensing BuildFont, its technology for converting existing digital typeface data into PostScript font format, Ikarus gradually lost its leading position. Ikarus is being further developed by URW++ and Dutch Type Library (DTL).

== Digitizing ==
The first stage of digitization of a typeface is to prepare the artwork by marking up. This involves putting tick marks around any curves at approximately 30 degree intervals along with extra tangent points where a curve blends onto a straight line. Some form of accurate graphics tablet is then used to input three types of points: curve points, corner points and tangent points. Any irregularities (e.g. lumps and flat spots) are then edited out by adjusting the position of the points on the computer. The human eye is extremely sensitive to spotting irregularities on smooth outlines and typical adjustments are of the order of tenths of millimetres on a character one hundred millimetres high. As the computer screen displays a rasterized image at relatively low resolution, high quality print outs (traditionally bromides) or cuts in film (Ulano) are used to proof the digitized shapes.

== Relationship with DTL FontMaster ==
The DTL FontMaster core is based on Ikarus. Furthermore, URW is also the exclusive Germany distributor for Dutch Type Library, DTL FontMaster's developer. DTL FontMaster Utilities are also developed by URW with DTL's president and founder Frank Blokland.

== See also ==
- Metafont
