= PFR =

PFR may refer to:

== Science and technology ==
- Plug flow reactor model, a reactor simulation model
- Prototype Fast Reactor, a nuclear reactor at Dounreay
- PFR, Phosphate Flame Retardant, a type of Flame Retardant
- pFR, a form of the light-sensing pigment phytochrome found in plants
- pFR, polymeric Flame Retardant, a type of Flame Retardant
- Polynomial Freiman-Ruzsa, a conjecture in Mathematics

== Other ==
- Presidential Fleet Review
- Partito Fascista Repubblicano, a former political party in Italy
- Persons and Family Relations, one of the subjects covered in Civil Law on the Philippine Bar Examinations
- PFFR, an alternative rock group
- PFR (band) (Pray for Rain), a Christian music group
- PFR, product feature request
- Pontefract Baghill railway station, England; National Rail station code PFR
- Pork fried rice, a Chinese dish
- Portable Font Resource
- Prism fusion range, a clinical eye test to assess motor fusion
- Pro Football Reference, a statistics database for professional American football
- Promoted from Reserves (badminton)
