= Fahrner =

Fahrner is a surname. Notable people with the surname include:

- Kate Fahrner, American actress and singer
- Theodor Fahrner (1859–1919), German jewellery designer
- Thomas Fahrner (born 1963), German swimmer
- Nachman Fahrner (born 1972), Jewish rock musician
- Ulrich Fahrner, Swiss sports shooter

== See also ==
- Fahrner Image Replacement
