= Scalable Inman Flash Replacement =

Obsolete dynamic web fonts implementation

sIFR
- Stable release: 2.0.7 / 16 October 2008; 17 years ago
- Written in: JavaScript, Adobe Flash
- Platform: web
- License: GNU Lesser General Public License
- Website: http://wiki.novemberborn.net/sifr/ (sIFR Documentation & FAQ at the Wayback Machine (archived 2013 January 20))

Scalable Inman Flash Replacement (sIFR) is an obsolete JavaScript and Adobe Flash dynamic web fonts implementation, enabling the replacement of text elements on HTML web pages with Flash equivalents. It is open-source and was initially developed by Mike Davidson and improved by Mark Wubben. It is a scalable variety of HTML text-to-flash replacement pioneered by Shaun Inman.

With the retirement of Adobe Flash across all major web browsers, and the introduction of web font support in CSS, sIFR is no longer in mainstream use.

== Overview ==
CSS support in web browsers did not, at the time of sIFR's creation, allow webpages to dynamically include web fonts, so there was no guarantee that fonts specified in CSS or HTML would show as intended, as the browsing user may or may not have had the specified font installed in their system. sIFR embeds a font in a Flash element that displays the text, pre-empting the need for a font to have been manually pre-installed on a user's system.

A common technique is to use raster graphics to display text in a font that cannot be trusted to be available on most computers. Text created this way pixelates when scaled and cannot be partially selected. In contrast, sIFR text elements mimic normal HTML text – they are relatively resizable and copyable.

sIFR requires JavaScript to be enabled and the Flash plugin installed in the reading browser. If either condition is not met, the reader's browser will automatically display traditional CSS based styling instead of the sIFR rendering. sIFR is not designed for body copy text as rendering greater bodies of text with Flash places formidable demands on the computer. Due to this restriction, Mike Davidson himself admitted that

While sIFR gives us better typography today, it is clearly not the solution for the next 20 years.

sIFR has been used on a variety of well-known web pages, such as those of GE, Nike and Red Hat. As of December 2008, the current sIFR release was version 2.0.7, and version 3 was in beta.

== Limitations ==
Growing popularity of browser ad blocker plugins and some smartphones may prevent Flash content from loading, instead displaying a "block" button which thereby obscures the page data, although this can be adjusted through individual plugin settings.

== Alternatives ==
Since the creation of sIFR, dynamic web fonts support in browsers has been renewed, with at least the latest versions of the four most popular browsers supporting them.

Older alternatives to sIFR included:

- Facelift Image Replacement (FLIR) is a similar software to sIFR. However, instead of using Flash, it embeds plain images that are generated automatically from the text on the webpage. However, FLIR requires that the website host is capable of running PHP, and it is even less accessible than sIFR.
- Cufón is an alternative that converts font paths to vector graphics stored in JSON data format and then renders the fonts to canvas elements or VML (depending on availability) using a JavaScript rendering engine. A significant disadvantage in using Cufón is the requirement that the embedded font's license allow its distribution in unencrypted form, which many commercial fonts expressly forbid.

== Trivia ==
The name of the original technique was derived from an anagram of the acronym for the CSS image-replacement technique it was designed to replace, Fahrner Image Replacement.

== See also ==
- Web typography
