= Generis (typeface) =

Generis is a typeface designed by type designer Erik Faulhaber. Generis was first published in November 2006 by Linotype.

The Generis is a type system consisting of four type families compatible both in style and metrics. It consists of 28 fonts in 6 weights. OpenType features include small caps and old-style figures. To improve legibility, open letter forms include wider openings, numbers are designed with maximum individuality, lowercase “l” in Generis Sans is curved, elimination of descenders in capital letters.

The Generis type families include Generis Serif, the elegant serif style with a classical essence; Generis Slab, the stable slab serif with technical characteristics; Generis Sans, the clear sans serif with an objective appearance; Generis Simple, the simplified sans serif with a contemporary nature, similar to FF Dax. The type system it is similar to the Compatil type family. The compatibility of the corresponding typefaces in the Generis type system allows document and graphic designers to create well-balanced documents using the harmonizing typefaces.

The fonts support ISO Adobe 2, Adobe CE, Latin Extended character sets.

== Family summary ==
Family	Serif	Slab	Sans	Simple
Weights
Thin	No	No	Yes	No
Light	Yes	Yes	Yes	Yes
Regular	Yes	Yes	Yes	Yes
Medium	Yes	Yes	Yes	Yes
Bold	Yes	Yes	Yes	Yes
Heavy	No	No	Yes	No
Alternate characters
Italic	Yes	No	Yes	No
small caps, old style figure	Yes	Yes	Yes	No
