= Proto.io =

Application prototyping platform

- Developer: PROTOIO Inc.
- Release: 2011
- Website: http://proto.io/

Proto.io is an application prototyping platform launched in 2011 and developed by PROTOIO Inc. Originally designed to prototype on mobile devices, Proto.io has expanded to allow users to prototype apps for anything with a screen interface, including Smart TVs, digital camera interfaces, cars, airplanes, and gaming consoles. Proto.io utilizes a drag and drop user interface (UI) and does not require coding.

== History ==
Since its launch in 2011, there have been six versions of Proto.io released.

=== Version 1 ===
In 2011, the 100% web-based Proto.io tool became available online. The web-based environment allowed users to create a project for either the iPad or iPhone. After a user created a few screens for a developing app, Proto.io could then link those pages together with interactive actions that are custom to hand held devices, such as clicks, taps, tap and holds, and swipes. With the platform, users could also create reusable templates into which prepackaged and editable elements could be dragged. Once the user had completed the prototype, Proto.io could then publish and preview the finished product not only on the web browser but also on the actual mobile device.

=== Version 2 ===
Proto.io V2 was released in early 2012 and expanded the supported mobile devices to accommodate for the Android platform, to include the Android Smartphone and Tablet. The platform also came with a newer user interface. Proto.io V2 also added collaboration features like comments and annotations as well as export to HTML functionality.

=== Version 3 ===
On September 28, 2012, with the release of version 3 of the platform, Proto.io became the first prototyping tool to allow users to prototype on almost any device with a screen interface, and the first mobile prototyping tool to support full-feature animations of user interface items within a prototype screen. The included icon gallery contains thousands of SVG icons for use as buttons, lists and tab bars. Proto.io V3 also supports web fonts, which allows the user to access all available online fonts.

=== Version 4 ===
The fourth version of Proto.io was launched in April 2013. This version was not as heavily focused on introducing new individual features, but rather aimed to improve the tool’s user interface and overall efficiency with a completely revamped editor.

=== Version 5 ===
October 2013 brought one of the major releases of Proto.io. With Version 5 users gained the capability to build HTML5 interactive animations more intuitively with the new Animation States & Timelines feature. This release introduced a wide variety of other new functionalities as well, such as easier Drag & Rotate, Variables and Item property interactions and new touch events.

=== Version 6 ===
The most recent release of Proto.io was launched in July 2016. The entire interface was redesigned, making the most used tools easily accessible to users. Additionally, animations became for the first time replayable directly on the editor, making it easier to finalize the motion design process. Adding and editing interactions was also simplified, with the introduction of an Interaction Wizard and Interaction Design Patterns. Single-click sharing and exporting also became available in the same release.
