= TrueDoc =

Outline font format for web pages

TrueDoc was an outline font specification developed by Bitstream that compactly encodes fonts for use in web pages through their TrueDoc system. Embedding a typeface in this way has the aim of eliminating graphics sometimes used in headings or other text, and replacing them by standard text, styled via CSS. The font files are made small by use of subsetting (only including the needed characters), and only need to be downloaded once. It is a secure method, in that fonts can only be used for the pages they were intended for, and not on other sites, or in other applications.

TrueDoc was natively supported in Netscape Navigator 4, but was discontinued in Netscape Navigator 6 and Mozilla because Netscape could not release Bitstream's source code. A WebFont Player plugin was available for Internet Explorer, but the technology had to compete against Microsoft's Embedded Open Type fonts natively supported by Internet Explorer 4 and up (Windows versions only). Another impediment was the lack of open-source or free tool to create webfonts in TrueDoc format, whereas Microsoft made available a free Web Embedding Fonts Tool to create webfonts in their format.

Corel Draw X4 was one of the few graphic design programs with the option of using the TrueDoc system while saving files.

Monotype Imaging, which acquired Bitstream's font business, neither markets the TrueDoc technology nor offers it for sale.

== See also ==
- Embedded OpenType – OpenType inherited font format, from Microsoft with MTX compression
- Web Open Font Format – File format for fonts in web pages
- Web typography – Publishing considerations for the Web
