= Presidential Fleet Review =

Presidential Fleet Review may refer to:

- President's fleet review, the review of the fleet by the President of India
- Naval Review, the review of the fleet by the President of the United States
