= Persons and family relations =

Persons and family relations is one of the subjects covered in civil law in the Philippine Bar Examinations.

== Scope ==
Persons and family relations mainly deals with the issues of family matters such as marriage, annulment and voiding of marriages, adoption, property settlements between spouses, parental authority, support for spouses and children, emancipation, legitimes (inheritance) of children from their parents and between relatives.

Some of the most important coverage of this subjects is the Family Code of the Philippines, or Executive Order 209, which was enacted by former president Corazon Aquino on July 6, 1987 (taking effectivity one year later after the completion of its official publication). The main reason for enacting this code was to replace the first book of the Civil Code of the Philippines which covers relations between persons, and family.

== Marriage ==
Based on the Family Code, a valid marriage requires certain essential and formal requisites. Essential requisites to marriage include legal capacity to marry and consent. Formal requisites include a valid marriage license, authority of solemnizing officer and a marriage ceremony where the contracting parties personally appear before the solemnizing officer and declare that they take each other as husband and wife in the presence of two witnesses of legal age.

Absence of any of the essential and formal requisites renders a marriage void ab initio (from the beginning), except in cases such as contracting parties in good faith believed that the solemnizing officer (who had no authority to solemnize the marriage) had the authority to solemnize marriage. Thus a marriage between minors or to a minor is void. Similarly, a marriage without a valid marriage license (except in certain circumstances) is void.

A defect in the essential requisites renders the marriage voidable and thus can be subject to annulment. Irregularities in the formal requisites does not affect the validity of the marriage but renders the parties responsible for such irregularities to be civilly, criminally or administratively liable.

However, there are cases where some of the formal requisites are not required, which usually happens in exceptional circumstances. An example is when the parties contracting marriage are living in a remote area inaccessible to any viable means of transport, such that it renders impossible the acquisition of a marriage license. In such cases, a valid marriage license may not be required. The same is also true for ethnic marriages which can forgo the need for a valid marriage license, provided they conform to the customs for such ethnic marriages.

== Annulment ==
A marriage can be annulled if there is a defect in the essential requisites. Consent obtained through fraud, deceit or violence, for example, can annul the marriage. Similarly, an individual below 21 years old who contracts to marry but does not obtain parental consent can also have their marriage annulled within the prescribed period.
