= Theodor Fahrner =

Steel engraver and jewelry designer from Pforzheim, Germany

Theodor Fahrner (4 August 1859 – 22 July 1919) was a trained steel engraver and jewelry designer from Pforzheim, Germany. He was known for his Art Nouveau and Jugendstil pieces, produced at affordable prices. After his death, his firm became one of the best known Art Deco designers.

== Biography ==
Theodor Fahrner was born to Theodor Fahrner, Sr., and Pauline Fahrner (née Schweikert). He had six sisters: Emma, Julie, Lina, Paulina Emilie, Luise Emilie and Bertha. Little is known about his school days; he learned to be a steel engraver and received his artistic training at the Pforzheim Kunstgewerbeschule.

Theodor Fahrner, Sr., owned a ring factory, and on his death in 1883, the younger Theodor Fahrner took the reins. By 1895, he was the sole proprietor. In the time of the upheaval before the turn of the century, Fahrner registered numerous patents and utility models. The breakthrough finally succeeded with the presentation of the jewelry designed by Max J. Gradl at the Paris World Exposition in 1900, where he was awarded a silver medal.

Fahrner did most of his own design work from 1899 to 1906. Fahrner's later designers included Maria Obrich, Patriz Huber, and Ludwig Knupper. The firm came to specialize in affordable Art Deco jewelry and achieved an international reputation.

Fahrner died in Pforzheim on July 22, 1919, leaving behind two daughters, Vera and Yella. He was buried at Pforzheim's main cemetery. The jewelry maker Theodor Fahrner was bought by the jeweler Gustav Braendle from Essling and passed on under the name Bijouteriewarenfabrik Gustav Braendle. The brand name "Fahrnerschmuck" was also used.
