= Compatil =

Typeface family

Compatil is a large typeface family designed for interchangeable fonts while maintaining identical document metrics.

== History ==
The Compatil typefaces were developed from 1999 to 2001 at Linotype Library GmbH. The name was derived from the word "compatible" and represents an intelligent and modular type system.

The project was led by Bruno Steinert, Managing Director of Linotype GmbH, Bad Homburg. Professor Olaf Leu and his analysis team at Mainz University of Applied Sciences. They composed an extensive range of requirements that Linotype Library’s team of experts incorporated into their new creation, extending and developing the concept as their work progressed. Silja Bilz and Professor Reinhard Haus were responsible for the project design and concept.

On 2004-12-07, Linotype announced Compatil 6.0, which introduced italic fonts for all families. The italic fonts have an 11-degree lean angle.

In 2005, the typeface families of Compatil were extended with the addition of true cursive typefaces.

== Usages ==
The typeface is used in printing newspapers and financial reports.

It was used in 2002 Business-to-Business Awards.
