= Subsetting =

Data reduction technique

In research communities (for example, earth sciences, astronomy, business, and government), subsetting is the process of retrieving just the parts (a subset) of large files which are of interest for a specific purpose. This occurs usually in a client—server setting, where the extraction of the parts of interest occurs on the server before the data is sent to the client over a network. The main purpose of subsetting is to save bandwidth on the network and storage space on the client computer.

Subsetting may be favorable for the following reasons:

- restrict or divide the time range
- select cross sections of data
- select particular kinds of time series
- exclude particular observations

== Subsetting within programs ==
You can subset within statistical software programs to help speed up the process of subsetting if needed. There are many different types of subsetting that can provide challenges with using software programs though.

Some types of subsetting are:

- Atomic Vectors
- Lists
- Matrices and Arrays
- Data Frames
- S3 Objects
- S4 Objects

For example, in the software program R as, there are different types of code to help with each type of subsetting.
