= CSS image replacement =

Web design technique

CSS image replacement is a dated web design technique that uses Cascading Style Sheets – as opposed to other technologies, like Flash – to replace text on a web page with an image containing that text. It is intended to keep pages accessible to users of screen readers, text-only web browsers, or other browsers where support for images or style sheets was either disabled or nonexistent, while allowing the image to differ between styles. One of many techniques was the Fahrner image replacement, named after Todd Fahrner, who was credited with the idea of image replacement in 2003.

With the introduction of CSS web font support in all major web browsers, CSS image replacement is now little used.

== Motivation ==
The typical method of inserting an image in an HTML document is via the <img> element. This method has its drawbacks with regards to accessibility and flexibility, however:

- While the alt attribute is designed for providing a textual representation of the image content, this precludes the use of HTML markup in the textual representation.
- Using the <img> element to show text is presentational. Many web designers argue that presentational elements should be separated from HTML content by placing the former in a CSS style sheet.
- Images referenced using an <img> element cannot be easily changed via CSS, causing problems with alternative presentations.

Image replacement techniques like Fahrner image replacement were devised to rectify these issues.

== Implementations ==
The original Image Replacement implementation described by Douglas Bowman used a heading, inside of which was a <span> element containing the text of the heading:

<h3 id="firHeader"><span>Sample Headline</span></h3>

Through style sheets, the heading was then given a background containing the desired image, and the <span> hidden by setting its display CSS property to none:

#firHeader
{
  width: 300px;
  height: 50px;
  background: #fff url(firHeader.gif) top left no-repeat;
}

#firHeader span
{
  display: none;
}

It was soon discovered, however, that this method caused some screen readers to skip over the heading entirely, as they would not read any text that had a display property of none. The later Phark method, developed by Mike Rundle in 2003, instead used the text-indent property to push the text out of the image's area, addressing this issue:

#firHeader
{
  width: 300px;
  height: 50px;
  text-indent: -5000px; /* ← Phark */
}

The Phark method had its own problems, however; in visual browsers where CSS was on but images off, nothing would display.

Also in 2003, Dave Shea's eponymous Shea method solves both of the issues earlier mentioned, at the cost of an extra <span>:

<h3 id="header"><span></span>Revised Image Replacement</h3>

By absolutely positioning an empty <span> over the text element, the text is effectively hidden. If the image fails to load, the text behind it is still displayed. For this reason, images with transparency cannot be used with the Shea method.

#header
{
  width: 329px;
  height: 25px;
  position: relative;
}

#header span
{
  background: url(firHeader.gif) no-repeat;
  position: absolute;
  width: 100%;
  height: 100%;
}

Over a dozen different methods has since been developed with varying degree of compatibility and complexity.
