= Miscellaneous Symbols and Arrows =

Unicode block

- Range: U+2B00..U+2BFF (256 code points)
- Plane: BMP
- Scripts: Common
- Symbol sets: Arrows; Filled shapes Technical; Astrological; Chess; Map symbols
- Assigned: 254 code points
- Unused: 2 reserved code points

Unicode version history
- 4.0 (2003): 14 (+14)
- 4.1 (2005): 20 (+6)
- 5.0 (2006): 31 (+11)
- 5.1 (2008): 82 (+51)
- 5.2 (2009): 87 (+5)
- 7.0 (2014): 202 (+115)
- 8.0 (2015): 206 (+4)
- 10.0 (2017): 207 (+1)
- 11.0 (2018): 250 (+43)
- 12.0 (2019): 252 (+2)
- 13.0 (2020): 253 (+1)
- 17.0 (2025): 254 (+1)

Unicode documentation
- Code chart ∣ Web page

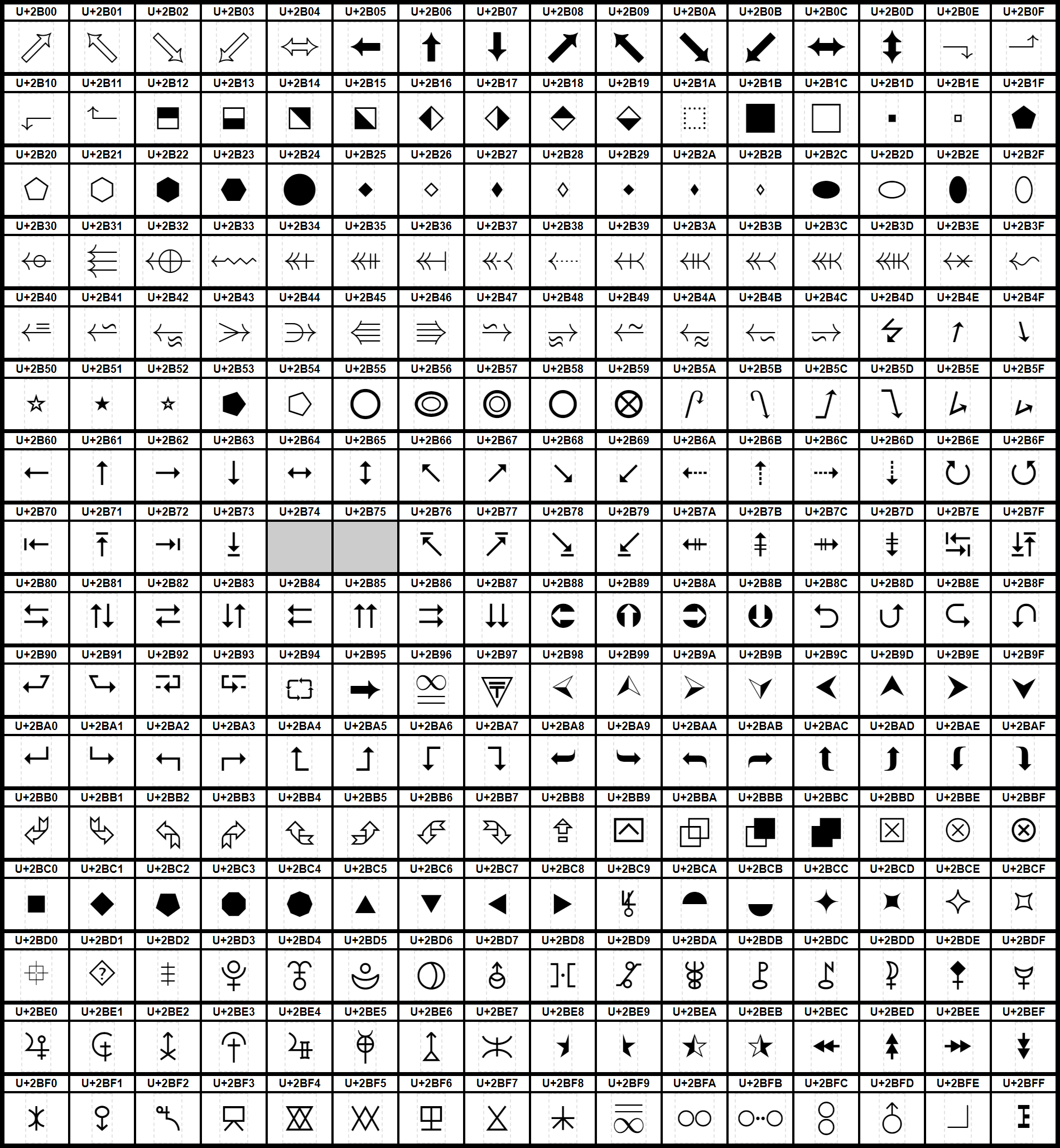
Graphical representation of the Miscellaneous Symbols and Arrows Unicode block

Miscellaneous Symbols and Arrows is a Unicode block containing arrows and geometric shapes with various fills, astrological symbols, technical symbols, intonation marks, and others.

== Block ==
Miscellaneous Symbols and Arrows^{[1]}^{[2]} Official Unicode Consortium code chart (PDF)
	0	1	2	3	4	5	6	7	8	9	A	B	C	D	E	F
U+2B0x	⬀	⬁	⬂	⬃	⬄	⬅	⬆	⬇	⬈	⬉	⬊	⬋	⬌	⬍	⬎	⬏
U+2B1x	⬐	⬑	⬒	⬓	⬔	⬕	⬖	⬗	⬘	⬙	⬚	⬛	⬜	⬝	⬞	⬟
U+2B2x	⬠	⬡	⬢	⬣	⬤	⬥	⬦	⬧	⬨	⬩	⬪	⬫	⬬	⬭	⬮	⬯
U+2B3x	⬰	⬱	⬲	⬳	⬴	⬵	⬶	⬷	⬸	⬹	⬺	⬻	⬼	⬽	⬾	⬿
U+2B4x	⭀	⭁	⭂	⭃	⭄	⭅	⭆	⭇	⭈	⭉	⭊	⭋	⭌	⭍	⭎	⭏
U+2B5x	⭐	⭑	⭒	⭓	⭔	⭕	⭖	⭗	⭘	⭙	⭚	⭛	⭜	⭝	⭞	⭟
U+2B6x	⭠	⭡	⭢	⭣	⭤	⭥	⭦	⭧	⭨	⭩	⭪	⭫	⭬	⭭	⭮	⭯
U+2B7x	⭰	⭱	⭲	⭳			⭶	⭷	⭸	⭹	⭺	⭻	⭼	⭽	⭾	⭿
U+2B8x	⮀	⮁	⮂	⮃	⮄	⮅	⮆	⮇	⮈	⮉	⮊	⮋	⮌	⮍	⮎	⮏
U+2B9x	⮐	⮑	⮒	⮓	⮔	⮕	⮖	⮗	⮘	⮙	⮚	⮛	⮜	⮝	⮞	⮟
U+2BAx	⮠	⮡	⮢	⮣	⮤	⮥	⮦	⮧	⮨	⮩	⮪	⮫	⮬	⮭	⮮	⮯
U+2BBx	⮰	⮱	⮲	⮳	⮴	⮵	⮶	⮷	⮸	⮹	⮺	⮻	⮼	⮽	⮾	⮿
U+2BCx	⯀	⯁	⯂	⯃	⯄	⯅	⯆	⯇	⯈	⯉	⯊	⯋	⯌	⯍	⯎	⯏
U+2BDx	⯐	⯑	⯒	⯓	⯔	⯕	⯖	⯗	⯘	⯙	⯚	⯛	⯜	⯝	⯞	⯟
U+2BEx	⯠	⯡	⯢	⯣	⯤	⯥	⯦	⯧	⯨	⯩	⯪	⯫	⯬	⯭	⯮	⯯
U+2BFx	⯰	⯱	⯲	⯳	⯴	⯵	⯶	⯷	⯸	⯹	⯺	⯻	⯼	⯽	⯾	⯿
Notes: 1. As of Unicode version 17.0; 2. Grey areas indicate non-assigned code points

== Emoji ==
The Miscellaneous Symbols and Arrows block contains seven emoji: U+2B05–U+2B07, U+2B1B–U+2B1C, U+2B50 and U+2B55.

The block has fourteen standardized variants defined to specify emoji-style (U+FE0F VS16) or text presentation (U+FE0E VS15) for the seven emoji.

Emoji variation sequences
U+	2B05	2B06	2B07	2B1B	2B1C	2B50	2B55
default presentation	text	text	text	emoji	emoji	emoji	emoji
base code point	⬅	⬆	⬇	⬛	⬜	⭐	⭕
base+VS15 (text)	⬅︎	⬆︎	⬇︎	⬛︎	⬜︎	⭐︎	⭕︎
base+VS16 (emoji)	⬅️	⬆️	⬇️	⬛️	⬜️	⭐️	⭕️

== History ==
The following Unicode-related documents record the purpose and process of defining specific characters in the Miscellaneous Symbols and Arrows block:

Version	Final code points (Note: Proposed code points and characters names may differ from final code points and names)	Count	L2 ID	WG2 ID	Document
4.0	U+2B00..2B0D	14	L2/99-353	N2056	"3", Amendment of the part concerning the Korean characters in ISO/IEC 10646-1:1998 amendment 5, 1999-07-29
4.0	U+2B00..2B0D	14	L2/99-380		Proposal for a New Work item (NP) to amend the Korean part in ISO/IEC 10646-1:1993, 1999-12-07
4.0	U+2B00..2B0D	14	L2/99-380.3		Annex B, Special characters compatible with KPS 9566-97 (To be extended), 1999-12-07
4.0	U+2B00..2B0D	14	L2/00-084	N2182	"3", Amendment of the part concerning the Korean characters in ISO/IEC 10646-1:1998 amendment 5 (Cover page and outline of proposal L2/99-380), 1999-12-07
4.0	U+2B00..2B0D	14	L2/99-382		Whistler, Ken (1999-12-09), "2.3", Comments to accompany a U.S. NO vote on JTC1 N5999, SC2 N3393, New Work item proposal (NP) for an amendment of the Korean part of ISO/IEC 10646-1:1993
4.0	U+2B00..2B0D	14	L2/00-066	N2170 (pdf, doc)	"3", The technical justification of the proposal to amend the Korean character part of ISO/IEC 10646-1 (proposed addition of 79 symbolic characters), 2000-02-10
4.0	U+2B00..2B0D	14	L2/00-073	N2167	Karlsson, Kent (2000-03-02), Comments on DPRK New Work Item proposal on Korean characters
4.0	U+2B00..2B0D	14	L2/00-285	N2244	Proposal for the Addition of 82 Symbols to ISO/IEC 10646-1:2000, 2000-08-10
4.0	U+2B00..2B0D	14	L2/00-291		Everson, Michael (2000-08-30), Comments to Korean proposals (L2/00-284 - 289)
4.0	U+2B00..2B0D	14		N2282	Report of the meeting of the Korean script ad hoc group, 2000-09-21
4.0	U+2B00..2B0D	14	L2/01-349	N2374R	Proposal to add of 70 symbols to ISO/IEC 10646-1:2000, 2001-09-03
4.0	U+2B00..2B0D	14	L2/01-387	N2390	Kim, Kyongsok (2001-10-13), ROK's Comments about DPRK's proposal, WG2 N 2374, to add 70 symbols to ISO/IEC 10646-1:2000
4.0	U+2B00..2B0D	14	L2/01-388	N2392	Kim, Kyongsok (2001-10-16), A Report of Korean Script ad hoc group meeting on Oct. 15, 2001
4.0	U+2B00..2B0D	14	L2/01-420		Whistler, Ken (2001-10-30), "f. Miscellaneous symbol additions from DPRK standard", WG2 (Singapore) Resolution Consent Docket for UTC
4.0	U+2B00..2B0D	14	L2/01-458	N2407	Umamaheswaran, V. S. (2001-11-16), Request to Korean ad hoc group to generate mapping tables between ROK and DPRK national standards
4.0	U+2B00..2B0D	14	L2/02-372	N2453 (pdf, doc)	Umamaheswaran, V. S. (2002-10-30), "M42.14 item i", Unconfirmed minutes of WG 2 meeting 42
4.0	U+2B00..2B0D	14	L2/11-438 (Note: See also L2/10-458, L2/11-414, L2/11-415, and L2/11-429) (Note: Refer to the history section of the Miscellaneous Symbols and Pictographs block for additional emoji-related documents)	N4182	Edberg, Peter (2011-12-22), Emoji Variation Sequences (Revision of L2/11-429)
4.1	U+2B0E..2B11	4	L2/03-119R2 (pdf, txt)	N2629	Shaneyfelt, Ted (2003-03-17), Horizontal arrows with tips vertical
4.1	U+2B12..2B13	2	L2/03-354	N2655	Freytag, Asmus (2003-10-10), Proposal -- Symbols used in Dictionaries
4.1	U+2B12..2B13	2	L2/03-356R2		Moore, Lisa (2003-10-22), "Consensus 97-C15", UTC #97 Minutes
5.0	U+2B14..2B19, 2B20..2B23	10	L2/04-406		Freytag, Asmus; Sargent, Murray; Beeton, Barbara; Carlisle, David (2004-11-15), Progress report on Mathematical Symbols
5.0	U+2B14..2B19, 2B20..2B23	10	L2/04-410		Freytag, Asmus (2004-11-18), Twenty six mathematical characters
5.0	U+2B1A	1	L2/05-140	N2943	Sargent, Murray (2005-05-11), Dotted Square
5.0	U+2B1A	1	L2/05-108R		Moore, Lisa (2005-08-26), "C.18", UTC #103 Minutes
5.0	U+2B1A	1		N2953 (pdf, doc)	Umamaheswaran, V. S. (2006-02-16), "7.2.6", Unconfirmed minutes of WG 2 meeting 47, Sophia Antipolis, France; 2005-09-12/15
5.1	U+2B1B..2B1F, 2B24..2B2F, 2B45..2B46, 2B50..2B54	24	L2/07-011R	N3198R	Freytag, Asmus; Beeton, Barbara; Ion, Patrick; Sargent, Murray; Carlisle, David; Pournader, Roozbeh (2007-01-15), 29 Additional Mathematical and Symbol Characters
5.1	U+2B1B..2B1F, 2B24..2B2F, 2B45..2B46, 2B50..2B54	24	L2/07-015		Moore, Lisa (2007-02-08), "Mathematical Characters and Symbols (C.4)", UTC #110 Minutes
5.1	U+2B1B..2B1F, 2B24..2B2F, 2B45..2B46, 2B50..2B54	24	L2/07-268	N3253 (pdf, doc)	Umamaheswaran, V. S. (2007-07-26), "M50.16", Unconfirmed minutes of WG 2 meeting 50, Frankfurt-am-Main, Germany; 2007-04-24/27
5.1	U+2B1B..2B1F, 2B24..2B2F, 2B45..2B46, 2B50..2B54	24	L2/11-438	N4182	Edberg, Peter (2011-12-22), Emoji Variation Sequences (Revision of L2/11-429)
5.1	U+2B1B..2B1F, 2B24..2B2F, 2B45..2B46, 2B50..2B54	24	L2/19-296R		Sunne, Samantha; Riedel, Frederik (2019-07-25), Proposal for Emoji: POLAR BEAR
5.1	U+2B1B..2B1F, 2B24..2B2F, 2B45..2B46, 2B50..2B54	24	L2/19-277R		Sunne, Samantha (2019-07-17), Proposal for Emoji: BLACK CAT
5.1	U+2B1B..2B1F, 2B24..2B2F, 2B45..2B46, 2B50..2B54	24	L2/19-292R4		Davis, Mark (2019-07-25), "3. Proposals that depend on color mechanism", ESC Recommendations for 2019Q3 UTC
5.1	U+2B1B..2B1F, 2B24..2B2F, 2B45..2B46, 2B50..2B54	24	L2/19-270		Moore, Lisa (2019-10-07), "E.1.2", UTC #160 Minutes
5.1	U+2B30..2B44	21	L2/05-318		Lazrek, Azzeddine (2005-10-24), Proposals for Unicode Consortium [Arabic mathematical symbols]
5.1	U+2B30..2B44	21	L2/05-320		Lazrek, Azzeddine (2005-07-10), Arabic Mathematical Diverse Symbols, Additional characters proposed to Unicode
5.1	U+2B30..2B44	21	L2/06-125	N3086-1, N3086	Lazrek, Azzeddine (2006-03-30), Diverse Arabic Mathematical Symbols
5.1	U+2B30..2B44	21	L2/06-108		Moore, Lisa (2006-05-25), "C.16", UTC #107 Minutes
5.1	U+2B30..2B44	21		N3103 (pdf, doc)	Umamaheswaran, V. S. (2006-08-25), "8.14", Unconfirmed minutes of WG 2 meeting 48, Mountain View, CA, USA; 2006-04-24/27
5.1	U+2B30..2B44	21		N3153 (pdf, doc)	Umamaheswaran, V. S. (2007-02-16), "M49.7", Unconfirmed minutes of WG 2 meeting 49 AIST, Akihabara, Tokyo, Japan; 2006-09-25/29
5.1	U+2B47..2B4C	6	L2/07-170	N3259	Freytag, Asmus; et al. (2007-04-18), Mathematical Arrows in FPDAM3
5.1	U+2B47..2B4C	6	L2/07-118R2		Moore, Lisa (2007-05-23), "111-C17", UTC #111 Minutes
5.1	U+2B47..2B4C	6	L2/07-268	N3253 (pdf, doc)	Umamaheswaran, V. S. (2007-07-26), "M50.3", Unconfirmed minutes of WG 2 meeting 50, Frankfurt-am-Main, Germany; 2007-04-24/27
5.2	U+2B55..2B59	5		N3353 (pdf, doc)	Umamaheswaran, V. S. (2007-10-10), "M51.32", Unconfirmed minutes of WG 2 meeting 51 Hanzhou, China; 2007-04-24/27
5.2	U+2B55..2B59	5	L2/07-259		Suignard, Michel (2007-08-02), Japanese TV Symbols
5.2	U+2B55..2B59	5	L2/07-391	N3341	Suignard, Michel (2007-09-18), Japanese TV Symbols
5.2	U+2B55..2B59	5	L2/08-077R2	N3397	Suignard, Michel (2008-03-11), Japanese TV symbols
5.2	U+2B55..2B59	5	L2/08-128		Iancu, Laurențiu (2008-03-22), Names and allocation of some Japanese TV symbols from N3397
5.2	U+2B55..2B59	5	L2/08-158		Pentzlin, Karl (2008-04-16), Comments on L2/08-077R2 "Japanese TV Symbols"
5.2	U+2B55..2B59	5	L2/08-188	N3468	Sekiguchi, Masahiro (2008-04-22), Collected comments on Japanese TV Symbols (WG2 N3397)
5.2	U+2B55..2B59	5	L2/08-077R3	N3469	Suignard, Michel (2008-04-23), Japanese TV symbols
5.2	U+2B55..2B59	5	L2/08-215		Pentzlin, Karl (2008-05-07), Comments on L2/08-077R2 "Japanese TV Symbols"
5.2	U+2B55..2B59	5	L2/08-289		Pentzlin, Karl (2008-08-05), Proposal to rename and reassign some Japanese TV Symbols from L2/08-077R3
5.2	U+2B55..2B59	5	L2/08-292		Stötzner, Andreas (2008-08-06), Improvement suggestions for n3469
5.2	U+2B55..2B59	5	L2/08-307		Scherer, Markus (2008-08-08), Feedback on the Japanese TV Symbols Proposal (L2/08-077R3)
5.2	U+2B55..2B59	5	L2/08-318	N3453 (pdf, doc)	Umamaheswaran, V. S. (2008-08-13), "M52.14", Unconfirmed minutes of WG 2 meeting 52
5.2	U+2B55..2B59	5	L2/08-161R2		Moore, Lisa (2008-11-05), "Consensus 115-C17", UTC #115 Minutes, "Approve 186 Japanese TV symbols for encoding in a future version of the standard."
5.2	U+2B55..2B59	5	L2/09-234	N3603 (pdf, doc)	Umamaheswaran, V. S. (2009-07-08), "M54.03b", Unconfirmed minutes of WG 2 meeting 54
5.2	U+2B55..2B59	5	L2/11-438	N4182	Edberg, Peter (2011-12-22), Emoji Variation Sequences (Revision of L2/11-429)
7.0	U+2B4D, 2B60..2B73, 2B76..2B95, 2B98..2BB9, 2BBD..2BC8, 2BCA..2BD1	107	L2/11-052R		Suignard, Michel (2011-02-15), Wingdings and Webdings symbols - Preliminary study
7.0	U+2B4D, 2B60..2B73, 2B76..2B95, 2B98..2BB9, 2BBD..2BC8, 2BCA..2BD1	107	L2/11-149		Suignard, Michel (2011-05-09), Proposal to add Wingdings and Webdings symbols
7.0	U+2B4D, 2B60..2B73, 2B76..2B95, 2B98..2BB9, 2BBD..2BC8, 2BCA..2BD1	107	L2/11-196	N4022	Suignard, Michel (2011-05-21), Revised Wingdings proposal
7.0	U+2B4D, 2B60..2B73, 2B76..2B95, 2B98..2BB9, 2BBD..2BC8, 2BCA..2BD1	107	L2/11-247	N4115	Suignard, Michel (2011-06-08), Proposal to add Wingdings and Webdings Symbols
7.0	U+2B4D, 2B60..2B73, 2B76..2B95, 2B98..2BB9, 2BBD..2BC8, 2BCA..2BD1	107	L2/11-344	N4143	Suignard, Michel (2011-09-28), Updated proposal to add Wingdings and Webdings Symbols
7.0	U+2B4D, 2B60..2B73, 2B76..2B95, 2B98..2BB9, 2BBD..2BC8, 2BCA..2BD1	107		N4103	"10.2.1 Wingdings/Webdings additions", Unconfirmed minutes of WG 2 meeting 58, 2012-01-03
7.0	U+2B4D, 2B60..2B73, 2B76..2B95, 2B98..2BB9, 2BBD..2BC8, 2BCA..2BD1	107	L2/12-130	N4239	Suignard, Michel (2012-05-08), "T3. Placement of Wingdings characters", Disposition of comments on SC2 N 4201 (PDAM text for Amendment 1.2 to ISO/IEC 10646 3rd edition)
7.0	U+2B4D, 2B60..2B73, 2B76..2B95, 2B98..2BB9, 2BBD..2BC8, 2BCA..2BD1	107		N4363	Suignard, Michel (2012-10-13), Status of encoding of Wingdings and Webdings Symbols
7.0	U+2B4D, 2B60..2B73, 2B76..2B95, 2B98..2BB9, 2BBD..2BC8, 2BCA..2BD1	107	L2/12-368	N4384	Suignard, Michel (2012-11-06), Status of encoding of Wingdings and Webdings Symbols
7.0	U+2B4D, 2B60..2B73, 2B76..2B95, 2B98..2BB9, 2BBD..2BC8, 2BCA..2BD1	107	L2/12-086	N4223	Requests regarding the Wingdings/Webdings characters in ISO/IEC 10646 PDAM 1.2, 2012-12-27
7.0	U+2B4D, 2B60..2B73, 2B76..2B95, 2B98..2BB9, 2BBD..2BC8, 2BCA..2BD1	107		N4353 (pdf, doc)	"M60.05h", Unconfirmed minutes of WG 2 meeting 60, 2013-05-23
7.0	U+2B4D, 2B60..2B73, 2B76..2B95, 2B98..2BB9, 2BBD..2BC8, 2BCA..2BD1	107		N4553 (pdf, doc)	Umamaheswaran, V. S. (2014-09-16), "M62.01c, M62.01h", Minutes of WG 2 meeting 62 Adobe, San Jose, CA, USA
7.0	U+2B4D, 2B60..2B73, 2B76..2B95, 2B98..2BB9, 2BBD..2BC8, 2BCA..2BD1	107	L2/14-250		Moore, Lisa (2014-11-10), "Consensus 141-C2", UTC #141 Minutes, "Create formal aliases of type "correction" for Unicode 8.0 for 2B7A LEFTWARDS TRIANGLE-HEADED ARROW WITH DOUBLE HORIZONTAL STROKE and 2B7C RIGHTWARDS TRIANGLE-HEADED ARROW WITH DOUBLE HORIZONTAL STROKE"
7.0	U+2B4D, 2B60..2B73, 2B76..2B95, 2B98..2BB9, 2BBD..2BC8, 2BCA..2BD1	107		N4739	"M64.06", Unconfirmed minutes of WG 2 meeting 64, 2016-08-31
7.0	U+2B4E..2B4F, 2B5A..2B5F	8	L2/10-357	N3914	Proposal to add characters used in Lithuanian dialectology to the UCS, 2010-10-29
7.0	U+2B4E..2B4F, 2B5A..2B5F	8	L2/11-135		Tumasonis, Vladas; Pentzlin, Karl (2011-05-02), Revised proposal to add characters used in Lithuanian dialectology
7.0	U+2B4E..2B4F, 2B5A..2B5F	8	L2/11-189		Whistler, Ken; Constable, Peter (2011-05-11), Review of Characters for Lithuanian Dialectology
7.0	U+2B4E..2B4F, 2B5A..2B5F	8	L2/11-191	N4062	Constable, Peter; Whistler, Ken (2011-05-13), USNB Comments on N3914 -Characters for Lithuanian Dialectology
7.0	U+2B4E..2B4F, 2B5A..2B5F	8	L2/11-116		Moore, Lisa (2011-05-17), "Consensus 127-C12", UTC #127 / L2 #224 Minutes, "Accept 14 characters for Lithuanian dialectology..."
7.0	U+2B4E..2B4F, 2B5A..2B5F	8	L2/11-223	N4070	Tumasonis, Vladas; Pentzlin, Karl (2011-05-24), Second revised proposal to add characters used in Lithuanian dialectology to the UCS
7.0	U+2B4E..2B4F, 2B5A..2B5F	8	L2/11-248	N4116	Pentzlin, Karl (2011-06-09), Report on the ad hoc re "Lithuanian dialectology" (SC2/WG2 N4070) held during the SC2/WG2 meeting at Helsinki
7.0	U+2B4E..2B4F, 2B5A..2B5F	8		N4103	"11.1.3 Lithuanian dialectology", Unconfirmed minutes of WG 2 meeting 58, 2012-01-03
7.0	U+2B4E..2B4F, 2B5A..2B5F	8	L2/12-130	N4239	Suignard, Michel (2012-05-08), "Germany T1", Disposition of comments on SC2 N 4201 (PDAM text for Amendment 1.2 to ISO/IEC 10646 3rd edition)
8.0	U+2BEC..2BEF	4	L2/12-303	N4318	Pentzlin, Karl (2012-09-10), Proposal to add four arrows to get a consistent mapping from ISO/IEC 9995-7 symbols to Unicode
8.0	U+2BEC..2BEF	4	L2/13-028		Anderson, Deborah; McGowan, Rick; Whistler, Ken; Pournader, Roozbeh (2013-01-28), "9", Recommendations to UTC on Script Proposals
8.0	U+2BEC..2BEF	4	L2/13-011		Moore, Lisa (2013-02-04), "E.4", UTC #134 Minutes
8.0	U+2BEC..2BEF	4		N4403 (pdf, doc)	Umamaheswaran, V. S. (2014-01-28), "10.3.3 Four new Arrows", Unconfirmed minutes of WG 2 meeting 61, Holiday Inn, Vilnius, Lithuania; 2013-06-10/14
10.0	U+2BD2	1	L2/15-083		Shirriff, Ken (2015-02-14), Proposal for addition of Group Mark symbol
10.0	U+2BD2	1	L2/15-149		Anderson, Deborah; Whistler, Ken; McGowan, Rick; Pournader, Roozbeh; Pandey, Anshuman; Glass, Andrew (2015-05-03), "23. Group Mark", Recommendations to UTC #143 May 2015 on Script Proposals
10.0	U+2BD2	1	L2/15-107		Moore, Lisa (2015-05-12), "E.2", UTC #143 Minutes
11.0	U+2BBA..2BBC, 2BF9..2BFE	9	L2/17-033R2	N4783R2	Everson, Michael; Wallace, Garth (2017-01-26), Proposal to encode symbols for chess notation
11.0	U+2BBA..2BBC, 2BF9..2BFE	9	L2/17-016		Moore, Lisa (2017-02-08), "E.2", UTC #150 Minutes
11.0	U+2BBA..2BBC, 2BF9..2BFE	9	L2/17-222		Moore, Lisa (2017-08-11), "Consensus 152-C2", UTC #152 Minutes, "Change the names of U+2BFA..U+2BFD to UNITED PAWNS SYMBOL, SEPARATED PAWNS SYMBOL, DOUBLED PAWNS SYMBOL, PASSED PAWN SYMBOL."
11.0	U+2BBA..2BBC, 2BF9..2BFE	9		N4953 (pdf, doc)	"M66.03e", Unconfirmed minutes of WG 2 meeting 66, 2018-03-23
11.0	U+2BBA..2BBC, 2BF9..2BFE	9	L2/17-353		Anderson, Deborah; Whistler, Ken (2017-10-02), "B. Chess Notation", WG2 Consent Docket
11.0	U+2BBA..2BBC, 2BF9..2BFE	9	L2/17-362		Moore, Lisa (2018-02-02), "Consensus 153-C2 and 153-C3", UTC #153 Minutes
11.0	U+2BBA..2BBC, 2BF9..2BFE	9	L2/18-115		Moore, Lisa (2018-05-09), "Consensus 155-C12", UTC #155 Minutes, "Make U+2BFE REVERSED RIGHT ANGLE have BidiMirroring=YES and a bidi-mirroring pair with U+221F."
11.0	U+2BD3..2BD6	4	L2/16-156		Anderson, Deborah; Whistler, Ken; Pournader, Roozbeh; Glass, Andrew; Iancu, Laurențiu (2016-05-06), "13. Astrology", Recommendations to UTC #147 May 2016 on Script Proposals
11.0	U+2BD3..2BD6	4	L2/16-121		Moore, Lisa (2016-05-20), "E.4", UTC #147 Minutes
11.0	U+2BD3..2BD6	4	L2/16-067R		Faulks, David (2016-08-12), Astrological Plutos
11.0	U+2BD3..2BD6	4		N4873R (pdf, doc)	"M65.04a, M65.08c", Unconfirmed minutes of WG 2 meeting 65, 2018-03-16
11.0	U+2BD3..2BD6	4	L2/16-325		Moore, Lisa (2016-11-18), "Consensus 149-C5", UTC #149 Minutes
11.0	U+2BD7..2BDF	9	L2/16-156		Anderson, Deborah; Whistler, Ken; Pournader, Roozbeh; Glass, Andrew; Iancu, Laurențiu (2016-05-06), "13.c", Recommendations to UTC #147 May 2016 on Script Proposals
11.0	U+2BD7..2BDF	9	L2/16-080		Faulks, David (2016-05-28), Additional Symbols for Astrology
11.0	U+2BD7..2BDF	9	L2/16-216		Anderson, Deborah; Whistler, Ken; McGowan, Rick; Pournader, Roozbeh; Glass, Andrew; Iancu, Laurențiu; Moore, Lisa (2016-07-30), "16.a", Recommendations to UTC #148 August 2016 on Script Proposals
11.0	U+2BD7..2BDF	9	L2/16-203		Moore, Lisa (2016-08-18), "E.2", UTC #148 Minutes
11.0	U+2BD7..2BDF	9		N4873R (pdf, doc)	"M65.08d", Unconfirmed minutes of WG 2 meeting 65, 2018-03-16
11.0	U+2BD7..2BDF	9	L2/16-325		Moore, Lisa (2016-11-18), "Consensus 149-C5", UTC #149 Minutes
11.0	U+2BE0..2BE7	8	L2/16-064R		Faulks, David (2016-03-06), Extra Symbols from Uranian Astrology
11.0	U+2BE0..2BE7	8	L2/16-156		Anderson, Deborah; Whistler, Ken; Pournader, Roozbeh; Glass, Andrew; Iancu, Laurențiu (2016-05-06), "13.b", Recommendations to UTC #147 May 2016 on Script Proposals
11.0	U+2BE0..2BE7	8	L2/16-121		Moore, Lisa (2016-05-20), "E.3", UTC #147 Minutes
11.0	U+2BE0..2BE7	8		N4873R (pdf, doc)	"M65.04a", Unconfirmed minutes of WG 2 meeting 65, 2018-03-16
11.0	U+2BE8..2BEB	4	L2/16-186		West, Andrew (2016-07-11), Proposal to encode four half star symbols
11.0	U+2BE8..2BEB	4	L2/16-216		Anderson, Deborah; Whistler, Ken; McGowan, Rick; Pournader, Roozbeh; Glass, Andrew; Iancu, Laurențiu; Moore, Lisa (2016-07-30), "14. Half star symbols", Recommendations to UTC #148 August 2016 on Script Proposals
11.0	U+2BE8..2BEB	4	L2/16-230		Shirriff, Ken (2016-08-04), Proposal for addition of half stars
11.0	U+2BE8..2BEB	4	L2/16-203		Moore, Lisa (2016-08-18), "E.6.1", UTC #148 Minutes
11.0	U+2BE8..2BEB	4	L2/16-254	N4747	Shirriff, Ken; West, Andrew (2016-09-12), Final proposal to encode four half star symbols
11.0	U+2BE8..2BEB	4		N4873R (pdf, doc)	"M65.08e", Unconfirmed minutes of WG 2 meeting 65, 2018-03-16
11.0	U+2BE8..2BEB	4	L2/16-325		Moore, Lisa (2016-11-18), "Consensus 149-C6", UTC #149 Minutes
11.0	U+2BF0..2BF2	3	L2/16-216		Anderson, Deborah; Whistler, Ken; McGowan, Rick; Pournader, Roozbeh; Glass, Andrew; Iancu, Laurențiu; Moore, Lisa (2016-07-30), "16.b", Recommendations to UTC #148 August 2016 on Script Proposals
11.0	U+2BF0..2BF2	3	L2/16-342		Anderson, Deborah; Whistler, Ken; Pournader, Roozbeh; Glass, Andrew; Iancu, Laurențiu (2016-11-07), "12B", Recommendations to UTC #149 November 2016 on Script Proposals
11.0	U+2BF0..2BF2	3	L2/16-173R	N4801	Faulks, David (2016-11-11), Eris and Sedna Symbols
11.0	U+2BF0..2BF2	3	L2/16-325		Moore, Lisa (2016-11-18), "E.9", UTC #149 Minutes
11.0	U+2BF0..2BF2	3	L2/17-016		Moore, Lisa (2017-02-08), "Consensus 150-C17", UTC #150 Minutes, "Change the codepoints of ERIS FORM 1, ERIS FORM 2, and SEDNA as follows: U+2BBA..U+2BBC to U+2BF0..U+2FF2"
11.0	U+2BF3..2BF8	6	L2/16-174R		Faulks, David (2016-06-09), Extra Aspect Symbols for Astrology
11.0	U+2BF3..2BF8	6	L2/16-342		Anderson, Deborah; Whistler, Ken; Pournader, Roozbeh; Glass, Andrew; Iancu, Laurențiu (2016-11-07), "12A", Recommendations to UTC #149 November 2016 on Script Proposals
11.0	U+2BF3..2BF8	6	L2/16-325		Moore, Lisa (2016-11-18), "E.10", UTC #149 Minutes
11.0	U+2BF3..2BF8	6	L2/17-037		Anderson, Deborah; Whistler, Ken; Pournader, Roozbeh; Glass, Andrew; Iancu, Laurențiu; Moore, Lisa; Liang, Hai; Ishida, Richard; Misra, Karan; McGowan, Rick (2017-01-21), "18. Astrological symbols", Recommendations to UTC #150 January 2017 on Script Proposals
11.0	U+2BF3..2BF8	6	L2/17-016		Moore, Lisa (2017-02-08), "E.4 Feedback on Extra Aspect Symbols for Astrology", UTC #150 Minutes
11.0	U+2BF3..2BF8	6	L2/17-020R2	N4811	Suignard, Michel (2017-01-24), Feedback on Extra Aspect Symbols for Astrology
12.0	U+2BC9	1	L2/17-191R	N4863	Silva, Eduardo Marín (2017-02-08), Proposal to encode NEPTUNE FORM TWO (revised)
12.0	U+2BC9	1	L2/17-255		Anderson, Deborah; Whistler, Ken; Pournader, Roozbeh; Moore, Lisa; Liang, Hai (2017-07-28), "23. Neptune", Recommendations to UTC #152 July-August 2017 on Script Proposals
12.0	U+2BC9	1	L2/17-222		Moore, Lisa (2017-08-11), "E.4", UTC #152 Minutes
12.0	U+2BC9	1		N4953 (pdf, doc)	"M66.16b", Unconfirmed minutes of WG 2 meeting 66, 2018-03-23
12.0	U+2BFF	1	L2/17-151R	N4864	Spix, Marius (2017-08-05), Character submission: Hellschreiber pause symbol (revised)
12.0	U+2BFF	1	L2/17-255		Anderson, Deborah; Whistler, Ken; Pournader, Roozbeh; Moore, Lisa; Liang, Hai (2017-07-28), "22. Hell pause character", Recommendations to UTC #152 July-August 2017 on Script Proposals
12.0	U+2BFF	1	L2/17-222		Moore, Lisa (2017-08-11), "E.7", UTC #152 Minutes
12.0	U+2BFF	1		N4953 (pdf, doc)	"M66.16c", Unconfirmed minutes of WG 2 meeting 66, 2018-03-23
13.0	U+2B97	1	L2/99-353	N2056	Amendment of the part concerning the Korean characters in ISO/IEC 10646-1:1998 amendment 5, 1999-07-29
13.0	U+2B97	1	L2/99-380		Proposal for a New Work item (NP) to amend the Korean part in ISO/IEC 10646-1:1993, 1999-12-07
13.0	U+2B97	1	L2/99-380.3		Annex B, Special characters compatible with KPS 9566-97 (To be extended), 1999-12-07
13.0	U+2B97	1	L2/00-084	N2182	Amendment of the part concerning the Korean characters in ISO/IEC 10646-1:1998 amendment 5 (Cover page and outline of proposal L2/99-380), 1999-12-07
13.0	U+2B97	1	L2/00-285	N2244	Proposal for the Addition of 82 Symbols to ISO/IEC 10646-1:2000, 2000-08-10
13.0	U+2B97	1		N2282	Report of the meeting of the Korean script ad hoc group, 2000-09-21
13.0	U+2B97	1	L2/01-349	N2374R	Proposal to add of 70 symbols to ISO/IEC 10646-1:2000, 2001-09-03
13.0	U+2B97	1	L2/01-388	N2392	Kim, Kyongsok (2001-10-16), A Report of Korean Script ad hoc group meeting on Oct. 15, 2001
13.0	U+2B97	1	L2/18-004		Silva, Eduardo Marín (2018-01-03), "Enclosed postal mark symbol", Proposal to reconsider compatibility symbols and punctuation used in the DPRK
13.0	U+2B97	1	L2/18-017		Silva, Eduardo Marín (2018-01-08), Update on enclosed postal mark
13.0	U+2B97	1	L2/18-007		Moore, Lisa (2018-03-19), "E.4", UTC #154 Minutes
13.0	U+2B97	1	L2/18-058		Silva, Eduardo Marín (2018-02-01), Proposal to encode the POSTAL MARK ENCLOSED IN DOWN POINTING TRIANGLE
13.0	U+2B97	1	L2/18-168		Anderson, Deborah; Whistler, Ken; Pournader, Roozbeh; Moore, Lisa; Liang, Hai; Chapman, Chris; Cook, Richard (2018-04-28), "28", Recommendations to UTC #155 April-May 2018 on Script Proposals
13.0	U+2B97	1	L2/18-115		Moore, Lisa (2018-05-09), "E.2", UTC #155 Minutes
13.0	U+2B97	1	L2/18-184R	N5009	Silva, Eduardo Marín (2018-11-05), Proposal to encode: SYMBOL FOR TYPE A ELECTRONICS (replaces L2/18-058)
13.0	U+2B97	1	L2/18-241		Anderson, Deborah; et al. (2018-07-20), "21", Recommendations to UTC # 156 July 2018 on Script Proposals
13.0	U+2B97	1	L2/18-183		Moore, Lisa (2018-11-20), "E.2", UTC #156 Minutes
17.0	U+2B96	1	L2/24-018		Bala, Gavin Jared; Miller, Kirk (2023-11-17), Unicode request for one chess symbol
17.0	U+2B96	1	L2/24-013R		Anderson, Deborah; Goregaokar, Manish; Kučera, Jan; Whistler, Ken; Pournader, Roozbeh; Constable, Peter (2024-01-22), "11. One Chess Symbol", Recommendations to UTC #178 January 2024 on Script Proposals
17.0	U+2B96	1	L2/24-006		Constable, Peter (2024-01-31), "Consensus 178-C33", UTC #178 Minutes

== See also ==
- Mathematical operators and symbols in Unicode
