= Ted V. Shaneyfelt =

American Computer Scientist and engineer

- Education: University of Hawaii at Hilo; University of California, San Diego; University of Texas at San Antonio
- Scientific career
- Fields: Computer science Electrical and Computer Engineering; Robotics
- Workplaces: University of Hawaii at Hilo
- Website: www2.hawaii.edu/~tvs/

Ted V. Shaneyfelt is an American Computer Scientist and engineer known for producing the user interface on the first dual-mode cellular telephone to be commercially deployed in North America.

== Life ==
In 1986, the University of Hawaii at Hilo awarded Ted Shaneyfelt their first Bachelor of Science degree in Computer Science. He received his Master of Science Degree in Electrical Engineering (Computer Engineering) specializing in free space optical computing in 1995 from the University of California, San Diego. In private industry, Shaneyfelt worked at ASI, Hughes Network Systems, Sony Electronics Inc., MCSI, and POH. He completed his Ph.D. in Electrical Engineering at the University of Texas at San Antonio in 2012. Dr. Shaneyfelt is currently teaching at the University of Hawaii at Hilo. Shaneyfelt is currently serving as program committee co-chair of the 2017 IEEE System of Systems Engineering Conference. He also served as the local arrangements chair the 8th IEEE 2013 International Conference on System of Systems Engineering (SoSE) and also local arrangements chair for the 2014 World Automation Congress WAC: 14th International Symposium on Robotics and Applications (ISORA), 10th International Symposium on Intelligent Automation and Control (ISIAC), 14th International Symposium on Manufacturing and Systems Engineering (ISOMSE), 9th International Symposium on Soft Computing for Industry (ISSCI), 9th International Forum on Multimedia and Image Processing (IFMIP). He is also currently serving as IEEE Membership Development Chair for the Island of Hawaii. He is a candidate for mayor of Hawaii County.

== Honors ==
- Elected to the grade of Senior Member - IEEE
- Eight Congressional Recognition Awards - U.S. House of Representatives
- Team Award - Hughes Network Systems
- Commemorative Award for Outstanding Contribution - Hughes Network Systems
- First Computer Science Graduate - University of Hawaii at Hilo
