= List of CJK fonts =

The first four characters of Thousand Character Classic in different typeface styles, script styles and type styles. From left to right: sans-serif (gothic), Ming, regular script, clerical script and seal script

This is a list of notable CJK fonts (computer fonts with a large range of Chinese/Japanese/Korean characters). These fonts are primarily sorted by their typeface, the main classes being "with serif", "without serif" and "script". This article names the two first classes Ming and sans-serif (gothic) while further dividing the "script" into several Chinese script styles.

The fonts are then sorted by their target writing system: (Note: A font targeted to a writing system usually still contains glyphs in the other writing systems.)

- Chinese: Chinese character. (May also support bopomofo.)
  This can be subdivided into the following classification:
  - Simplified Chinese
  - Traditional Chinese (General, using printing standard or jiu zixing, 舊字形)
  - Traditional Chinese (Taiwan, using Standard Form of National Characters by the Ministry of Education, 國字標準字體)
  - Traditional Chinese (Hong Kong, using the List of Graphemes of Commonly-Used Chinese Characters by the Education Bureau, 常用字字形表)

The following localization table shortens Simplified Chinese to SC and Traditional Chinese to TC.

- Japanese: kanji, hiragana and katakana
- Korean: Hangul, hanja, etc.
- Vietnamese: for the Nôm script formerly used
- Zhuang: for Sawndip
- Pan-Unicode: intended to globally support the majority of Unicode's characters, and not specifically designed for one or a few writing systems (note that Pan-Unicode font ≠ Unicode font (Note: If a Unicode font (font containing a wide range of Unicode's characters) is targeted to one or a few writing systems, it will not be listed as a "pan-Unicode font" (font intended to globally support a wide range of Unicode's characters)))
- Pan-CJK: intended to support the majority of Chinese/Japanese/Korean characters, and not specifically designed for any one of these writing systems

== Legends ==
- [F] means the font is free and open-source software (FOSS).
- ~~[F]~~ means it was formerly seen as FOSS but has been involved in a legal controversy.
- [FP] means the font is free for personal use, but for commercial use, it requires a paid commercial license.
- [P] means that the font is not free and requires a paid license for personal and commercial uses.

== Ming (Song) ==
Sample of Ming typeface. Shown here are its forms in (from top to bottom): Simplified Chinese, Traditional Chinese, and Japanese.

Sample of Source Han Serif

=== Pan-Unicode/Pan-CJK ===
Name	Localisation	Editor/Creator	Licensing	Comments
Bitstream Cyberbit	Pan-Unicode	Bitstream Inc.	[FP]	
TPTQ Serif CJK	Pan-CJK	Typotheque	Commercial	
Hanazono Mincho 花園明朝	Pan-CJK	Kamichi Koichi and GlyphWiki contributors	Hanazono Font License or SIL Open Font License	HanaMinA (Japanese: 花園明朝A) for BMP and HanaMinB (花園明朝B) for SIP – covers all CJK, CJK Compatibility, CJK Unified Ideographs Extension A, B, C, D, E, and F. This font has issues in LaTeX. (Note: If rotated with \setCJKmainfont[Vertical=RotatedGlyphs]{HANAMINA.TTF, as required for traditional writing: some characters aren't displayed after rotating, while they work without rotation.) It has not been updated since 2017 and has been succeeded by Jigmo.
Jigmo 字雲	Pan-CJK	Kamichi Koichi and GlyphWiki contributors	CC0 1.0 Universal	Jigmo, Jigmo2, and Jigmo3. Version 20250912 offers complete coverage of all Unicode CJK characters up to CJK Unified Ideographs Extension J introduced in 2025 with Unicode version 17.0.
Source Han Serif; Noto Serif CJK; Chinese: 思源宋体; Japanese: 源ノ明朝; Korean: 본명조	Pan-CJK	Adobe and Google	SIL Open Font License	SIL Open Font License v.1.1 in April 2017.
TH-Tshyn 天珩全字库	Pan-Unicode	Sim CheonHyeong 沈天珩		TH-Tshyn-P0, TH-Tshyn-P1, TH-Tshyn-P2 and TH-Tshyn-P16. Version 4.1.0 offers complete coverage of all Unicode CJK characters up to CJK Unified Ideographs Extension I introduced in 2023 with Unicode version 15.1.
DFPMingLight-UN 華康細明體(P)-UN	Pan-Unicode	DynaComware	Commercial	

=== Chinese ===
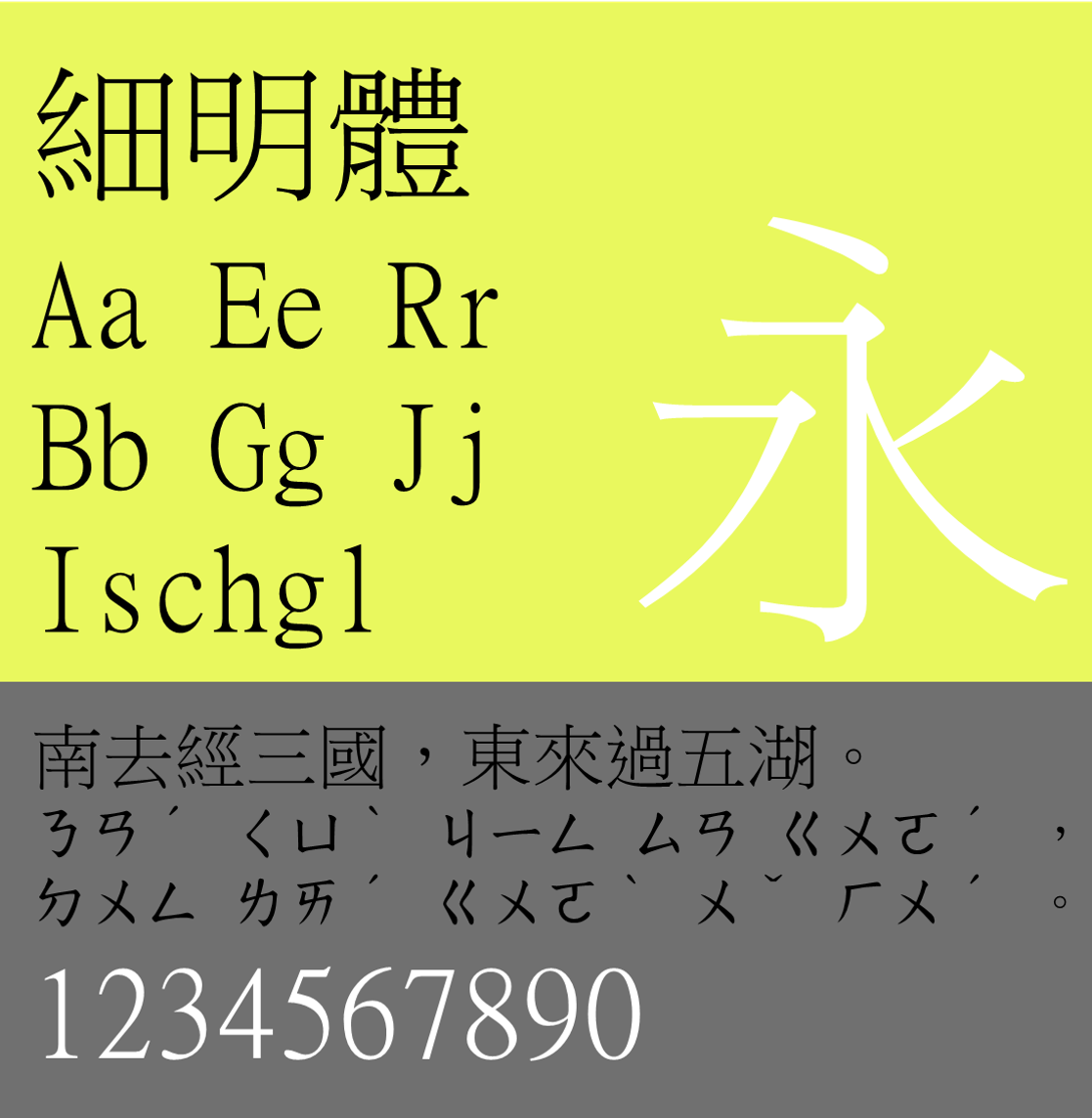
Sample of MingLiU (細明體), monospaced Latin characters.

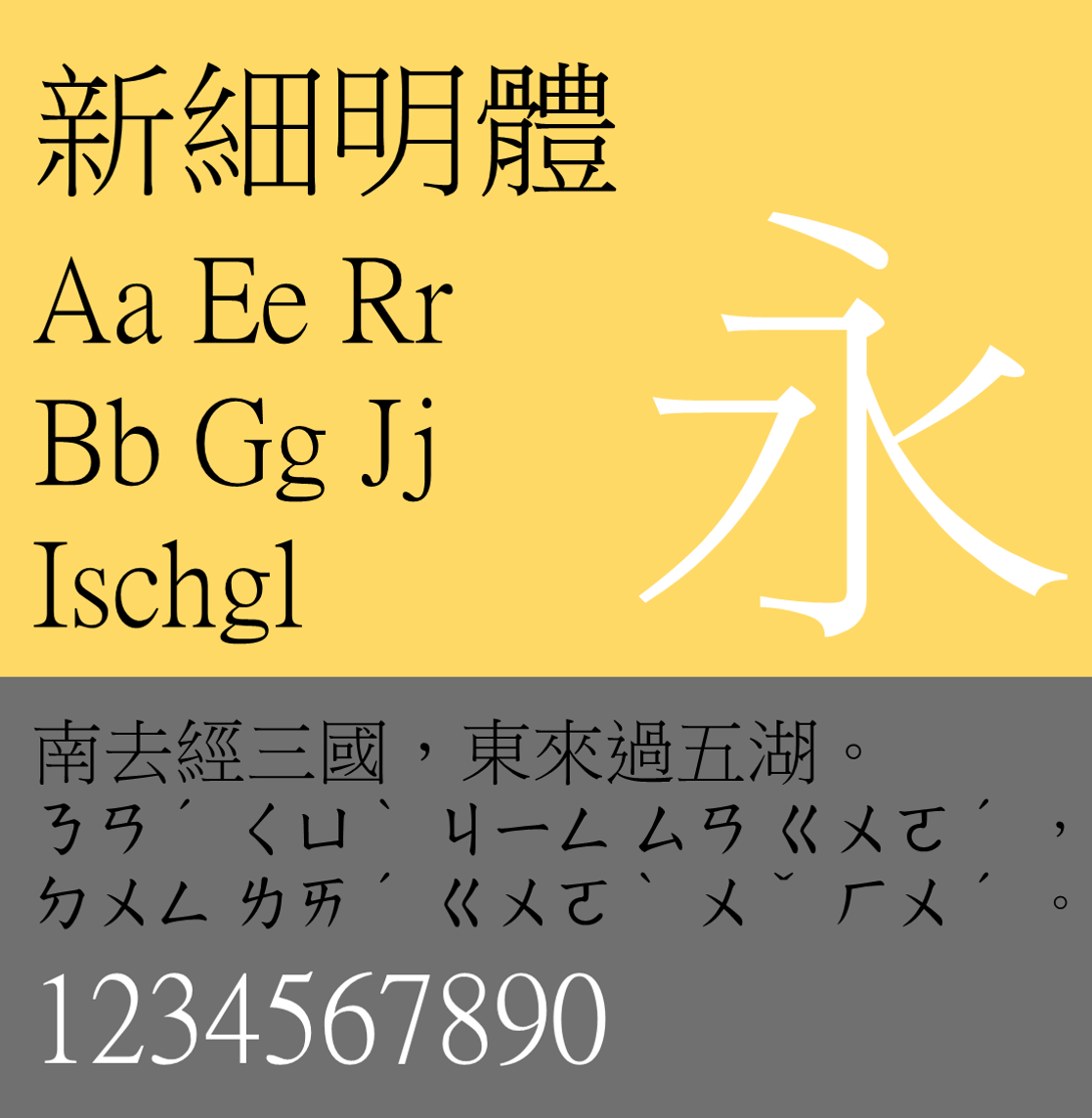
Sample of PMingLiU (新細明體), proportional Latin characters.

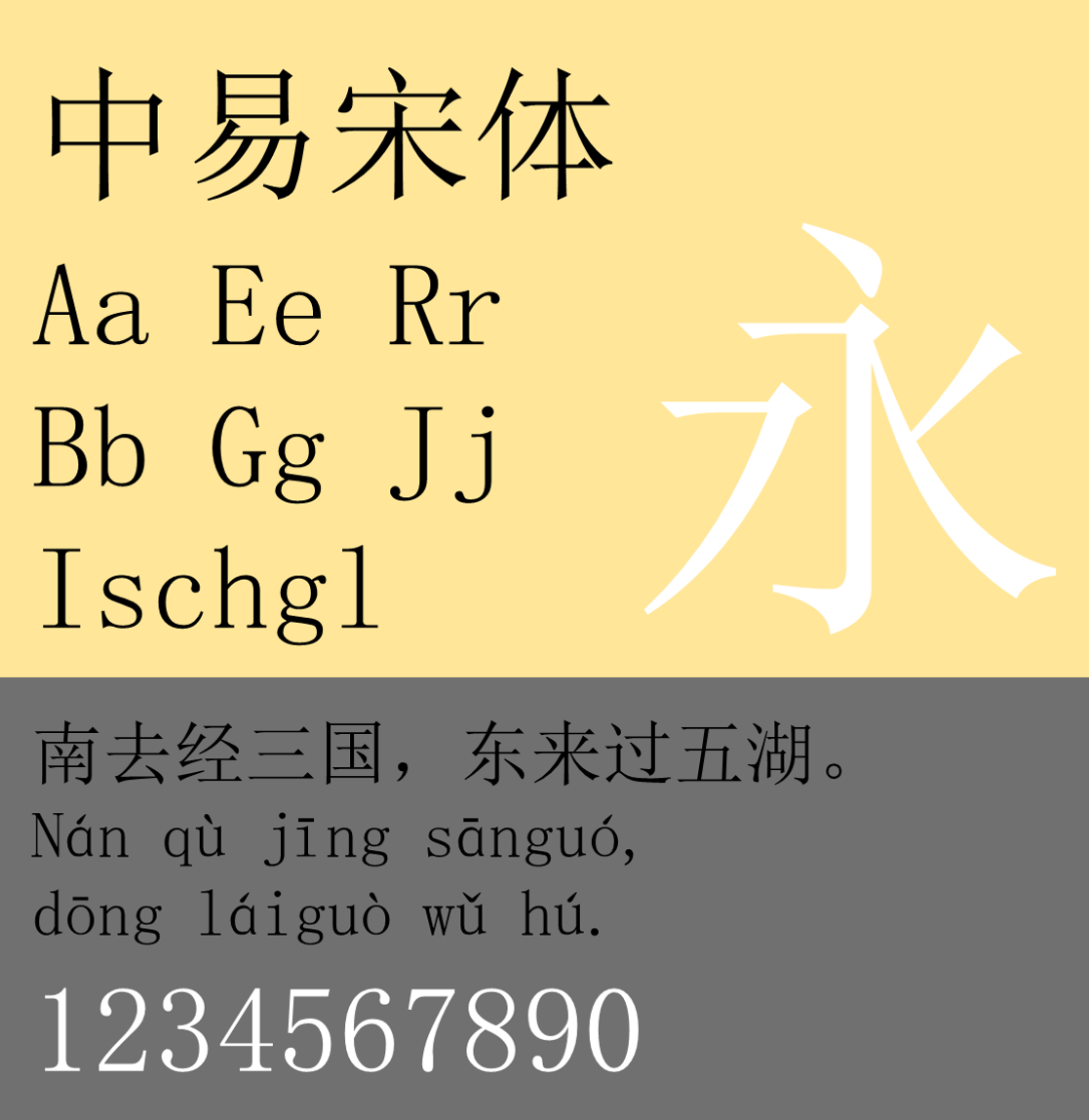
Sample of SimSun (中易宋体), monospaced Latin characters.

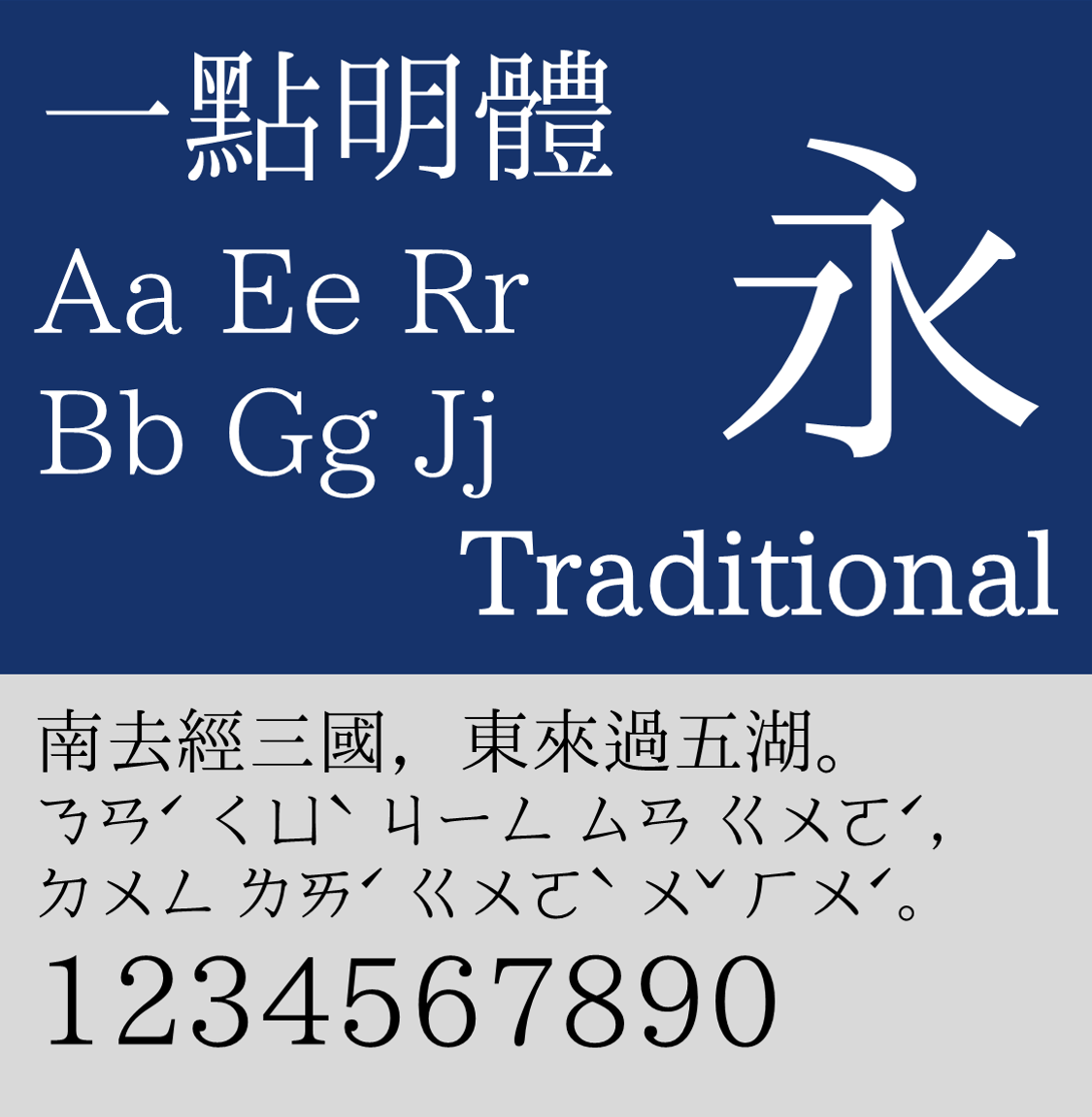
Sample of I.Ming (一點明體)

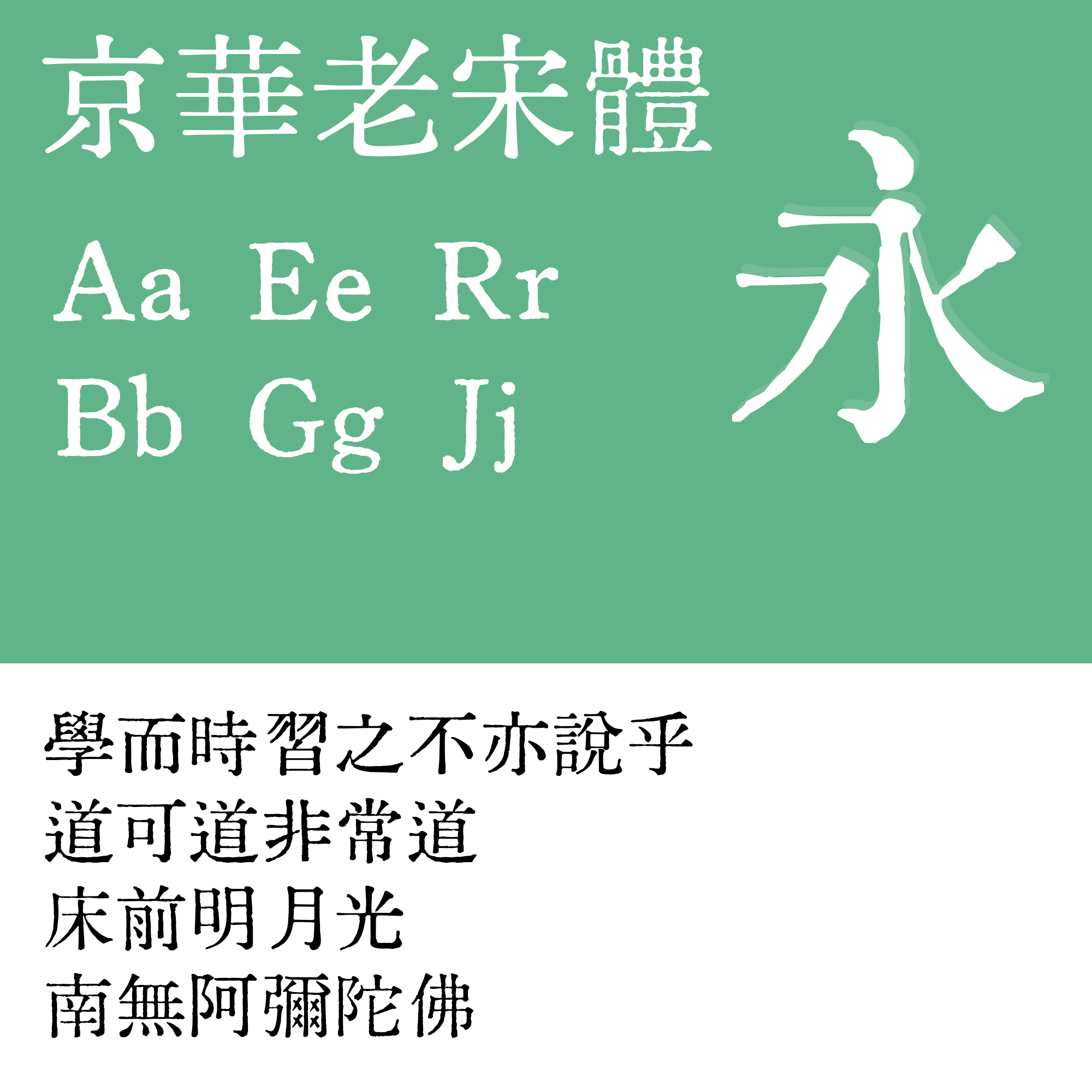
Sample of KingHwa OldSong (京華老宋体)

A comparative display of seven commercial Chinese serif (Ming) fonts from leading foundries: FounderType, Hanyi, Adobe, and Monotype. The fonts are: FZ ShuSong (方正书宋), FZ XinShuSong (方正新书宋), FZ GuiFanShuSong (方正规范书宋), HY ShuSongEr (汉仪书宋二), HY XuanSong (汉仪玄宋), Adobe Song (Adobe 宋体), and M Sung PRC (蒙纳宋体).

Name	Localisation	Editor/Creator	Licensing	Comments
BabelStone Han	SC	Andrew West	1999 Arphic Public License	
DLCMingMedium 華康中明體 DLCMingBold 華康粗明體	TC	Microsoft		
MingLiU 細明體	TC (Taiwan)	Microsoft		Default interface typeface for Windows 3.0 to Windows XP.
PMingLiU 新細明體	TC (Taiwan)	Microsoft		Distributed starting from Windows 95.
MingLiU_HKSCS 細明體_HKSCS MingLiU_HKSCS-ExtB 細明體_HKSCS-ExtB	TC (Hong Kong)			
LiSong Pro Light 儷宋 Pro	TC (Hong Kong)			
Apple LiSung Light 蘋果儷細宋	TC (Hong Kong)			
I.Ming; I.明體	TC (General)		IPA font licence	Derived from IPAex Minchō font, available at Keshilu blog (刻石錄) and GitHub.
MS Song; MS宋体	SC	Microsoft		
SimSun 中易宋体, 宋体	SC	Microsoft		Default interface typeface for Windows 3.1x to Windows XP, distributed starting from Windows 3.1x. Monospaced Latin characters. Unlike NSimSun (below), this is not labelled monospaced in the post and OS/2 table.
NSimSun 新宋体	SC	Microsoft		Monospaced Latin characters.
SimSun-18030 宋体-18030 NSimSun-18030 新宋体-18030	SC	Microsoft		
Simsun (Founder Extended) 宋体-方正超大字符集	SC	Microsoft		
SimSun-ExtB or Sun-ExtB 宋体-ExtB	SC	Microsoft		
SimSun-ExtG 宋体-ExtG	SC	Microsoft		Distributed with Windows 11 2023 Update and 2024 Update.
Song	SC			
STSong 华文宋体	SC	SinoType Technology (常州华文印刷新技术)		
STZhongsong 华文中宋	SC	Microsoft		
TW-Sung, TW-Sung-Ext-B, TW-Sung-Plus 全字庫正宋體	TC (Taiwan)	Ministry of Education, Taiwan (教育部)	Open Government Data License v1.0, equivalent to CC-BY 4.0 International license	
WenQuanYi Bitmap Song 文泉驿点阵宋体	SC		GNU GPL	Raster typeface.
KingHwa OldSong 京華老宋体	SC, TC	Terri Wong (特里王)		
FangZheng ShuSong 方正书宋	SC, TC	FounderType		
FangZheng PingXian YaSong 方正屏显雅宋	SC	FounderType	Commercial	
FangZheng BoYaSong 方正博雅宋	SC, TC	FounderType	Commercial	
FangZheng LanTingSong 方正兰亭宋	SC	FounderType	Commercial	
FangZheng YaSong family 方正雅宋	SC, TC	FounderType	Commercial	
FangZheng YouSong family 方正悠宋	SC	FounderType	Commercial	
FangZheng XiaoBiaoSong 方正小标宋	SC, TC	FounderType	Commercial	
FangZheng DaBiaoSong 方正大标宋	SC, TC	FounderType	Commercial	
FangZheng GuiFan ShuSong 方正规范书宋	SC	FounderType	Commercial	
FangZheng LanTing KanSong 方正兰亭刊宋	SC	FounderType	Commercial	
FangZheng BaoSong 方正报宋	SC	FounderType	Commercial	
FangZheng BoYa FangKanSong 方正博雅方刊宋	SC	FounderType	Commercial	
FangZheng BoYa KanSong 方正博雅刊宋	SC	FounderType	Commercial	
FangZheng XinShuSong 方正新书宋	SC, TC	FounderType	Commercial	
FangZheng SongYi 方正宋一	SC, TC	FounderType	Commercial	
FangZheng XinBaoSong 方正新报宋	SC	FounderType	Commercial	
FangZheng SongSan 方正宋三	SC	FounderType	Commercial	
Hanyi ShuSongEr 汉仪书宋二	SC	FounderType	Commercial	
Hanyi ZhongSong 汉仪中宋	SC	FounderType	Commercial	
Hanyi XuanSong 汉仪玄宋	SC	FounderType	Commercial	
WenJinMincho 文津宋体	SC	takushun-wu	SIL Open Font License	

=== Japanese ===
Sample of IPAMinchō typeface.

Name	Editor/Creator	Licensing	Comments
IPAex Minchō; IPAex明朝	Innovation Platform Agency, Japan	IPA font licence	Part of IPA font series.
IPAmj Minchō; IPAmj明朝	Innovation Platform Agency, Japan	IPA font licence	Part of IPA font series, includes many characters for names. Released from here.
MS Mincho ＭＳ 明朝	Microsoft		
MS PMincho ＭＳ Ｐ明朝	Microsoft		
Kochi Mincho 東風明朝		Public domain	
Hiragino Minchō Pro W3, Hiragino Minchō Pro W6 ヒラギノ明朝Pro W3, ヒラギノ明朝Pro W6	SCREEN Graphic Solutions	Commercial	Included in Mac OS X/macOS.
Heisei Minchō 平成明朝	Adobe (distributor, original by JSA)	Commercial	
RyūMin (Ryūbundō Minchō) リュウミン	Morisawa Inc.	Commercial	
Kozuka Minchō 小塚明朝	Adobe	Commercial	
Sazanami Mincho さざなみ明朝	Electronic Font Open Laboratory (efont)	[F] Modified BSD License	
YuMincho 游明朝体	Jiyu-Kobo (字游工房)	Commercial	
BunyuMin 文游明朝体	Jiyu-Kobo (字游工房)	Commercial	

=== Korean ===
English name	Editor/Creator	Licensing	Comments
Batang 바탕			Distributed by Microsoft with its Windows operating system.
BatangChe 바탕체			Distributed by Microsoft with its Windows operating system. Monospace font.
Gungsuh 궁서			Distributed by Microsoft with its Windows operating system.
GungsuhChe 궁서체			Distributed by Microsoft with its Windows operating system. Monospace font.
AppleMyungjo 애플명조			Default Korean font on Apple Mac OS, Mac OS X, and iOS. Fully supports Unicode from Mac OS X 10.5 Leopard.
UnBatang, UnGungsuh 은바탕, 은궁서		[F]	Included in most Linux distributions.
Baekmuk Batang 백묵 바탕	Kim Jeong-hwan (김정환)	[F]	Distributed on most Linux distributions.
Seoul Hangang 서울한강체			Distributed by Seoul Metropolitan Government as its official Ming typeface. Special font for vertical writing included.
Nanum Myeongjo; 나눔명조	Naver	SIL Open Font License	One of Nanum-series fonts, distributed by Naver.
Hamchorom Batang 함초롬바탕	Hancom	[F]	Developed by Hancom, supporting Unicode from 1.0 to 5.0 and Hangul Jamo Extended A/B.
Jieubsida Batang 지읍시다바탕		[F]	Korean-language, Ming style offshoot of the Tsukurimashou meta-family, built using METAFONT. License: GPL.

=== Vietnamese ===
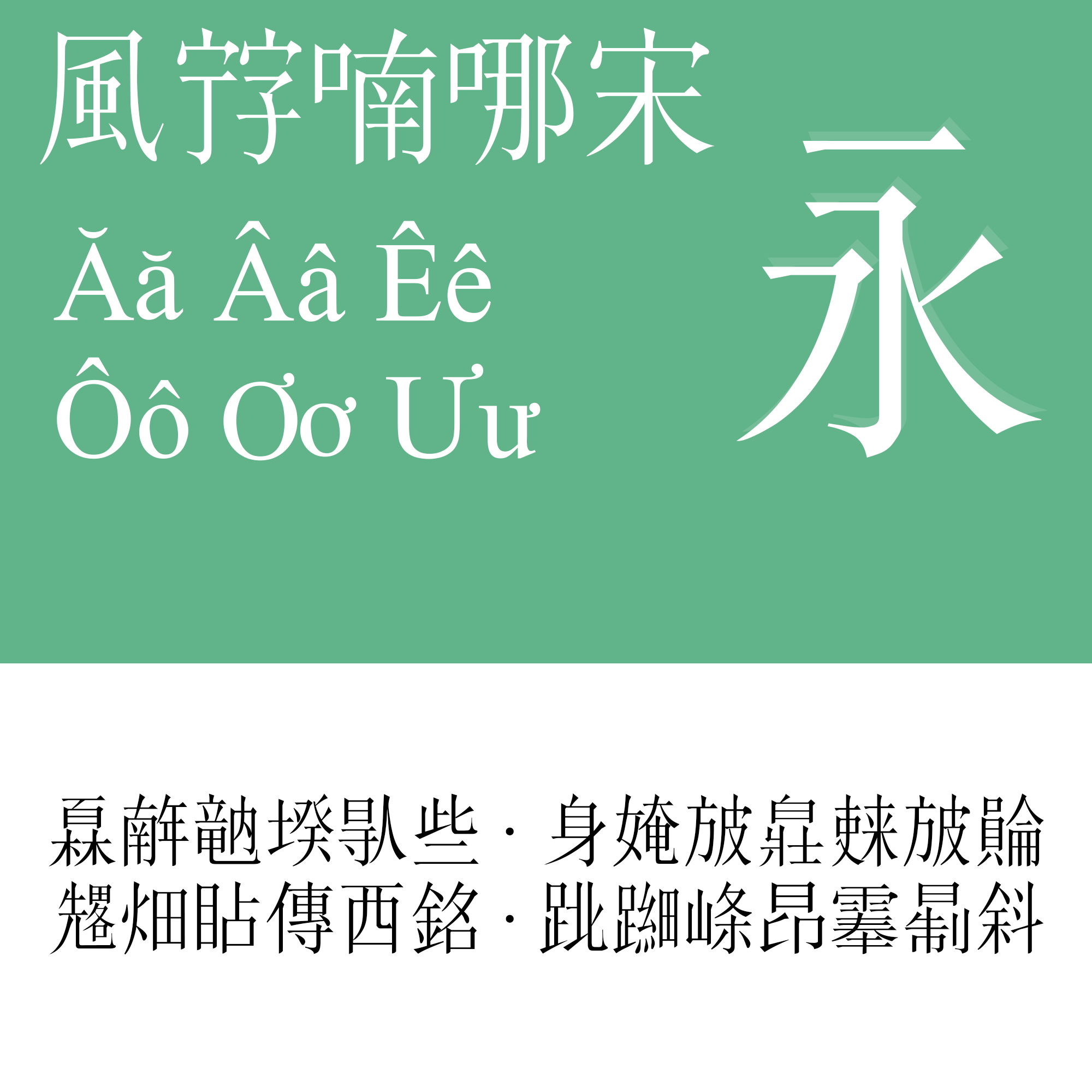
Sample of Nôm Na Tống

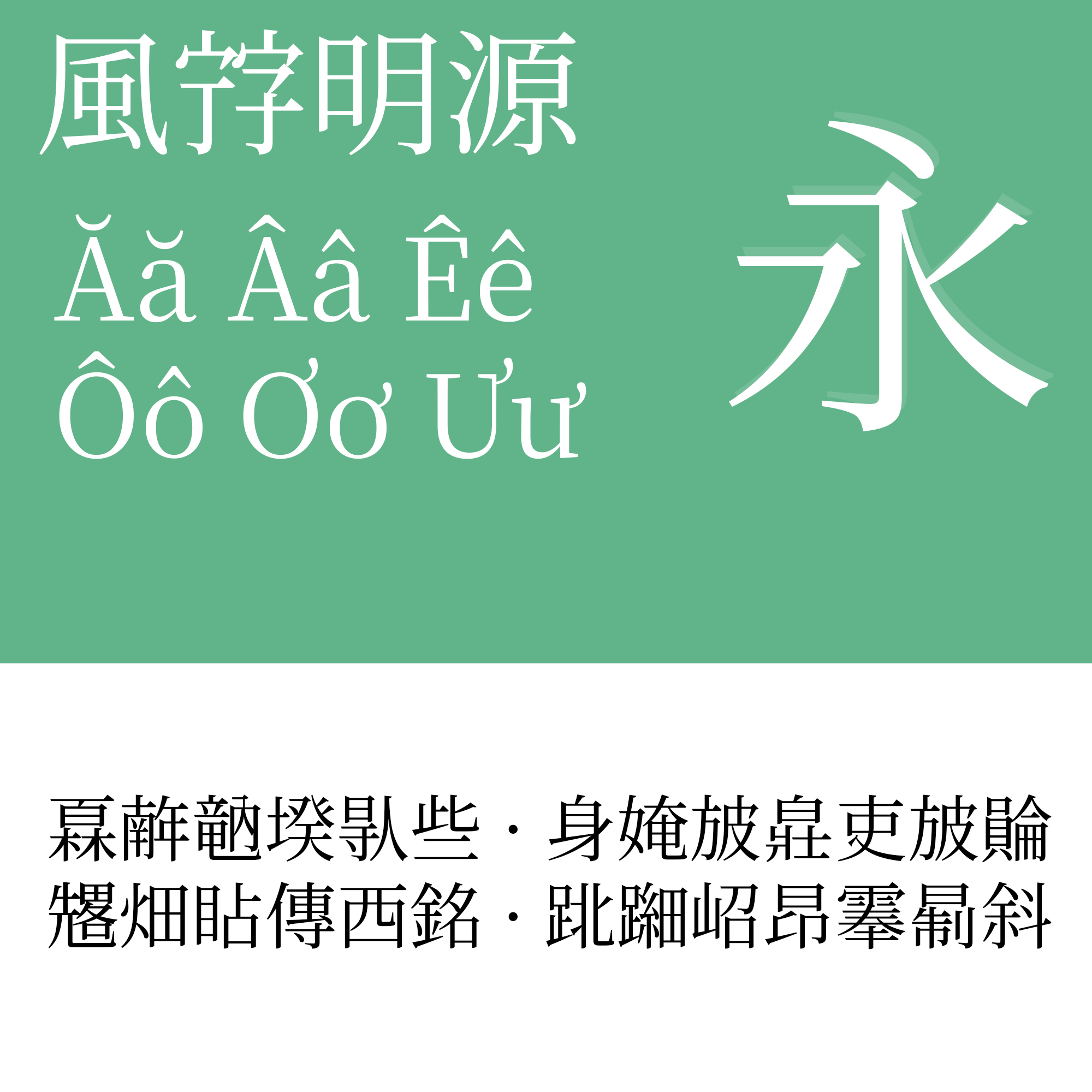
Sample of Minh Nguyên

Name	Editor/Creator	Licensing	Comments
Nôm Na Tống 5.040 喃哪宋 5.040			Created by the Vietnamese Nôm Preservation Foundation. It is based on characters found in Thiền Tông Bản Hạnh (The Origin of Buddhist Meditation, 1933) by Thích Thanh Từ.
Han Nom Font Set		GPL	
Han-Nom Minh 1.43 漢喃明 1.43	UBPSHNVN		
Han-Nom Ming 1.10 漢喃明 1.10	UBPSHNVN		
Minh Nguyen 1.10 明源 1.10	UBPSHNVN		

=== Zhuang ===
Name	Editor/Creator	Licensing	Comments
Sawndip		1999 Arphic Public License	

== Sans-serif ==
=== Pan-Unicode/Pan-CJK ===
Sample of Source Han Sans

Name	Localisation	Editor/Creator	Licensing	Comments
Arial Unicode MS	Pan-Unicode		[FP] Bundled	
TPTQ Sans CJK	Pan-CJK	Typotheque	Commercial	TDC winner 2023. Used in Ford vehicles in HMI consoles.
Droid Sans Fallback	Pan-Unicode (SC style)	Ascender Corporation for Google's Android	Apache License 2	Was the default system font for Android below version 4.4.2. Replaced by Source Han Sans.
Source Han Sans; Noto Sans CJK; Chinese: 思源黑体; Japanese: 源ノ角ゴシック; Korean: 본고딕	Pan-CJK	Adobe, Google, SinoType, Iwata Corporation, Sandoll Communication.	SIL Open Font License	License: Apache License 2 on July 15, 2014. Since September 29, 2015, all Noto fonts are licensed under the SIL Open Font License rather than the Apache licence.
LINE Seed Sans	TC (Taiwan), JP, KR	LY Corporation	SIL Open Font License	Released in 2021.

=== Chinese ===
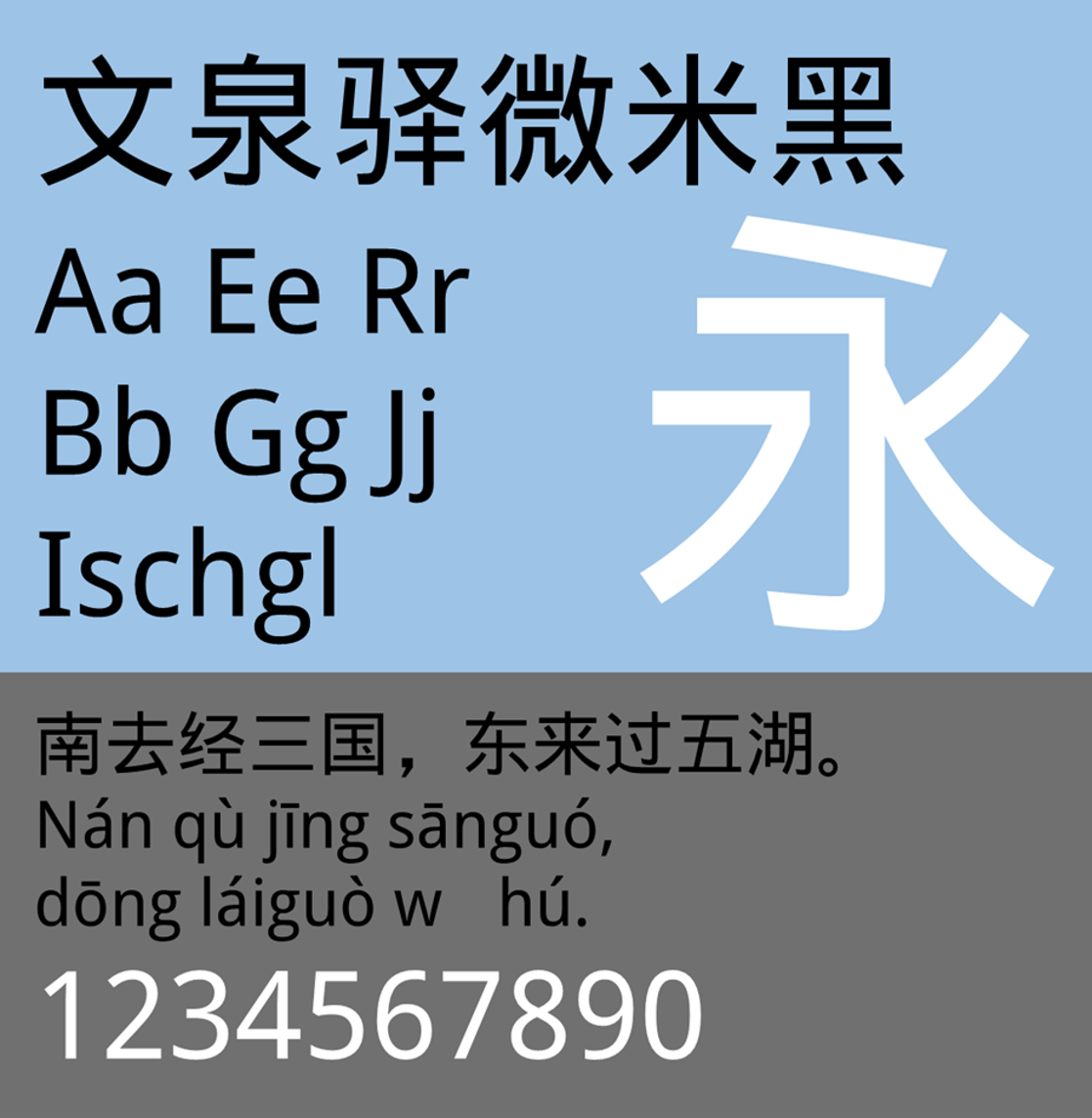
Sample of WenQuanYi Micro Hei (文泉驿微米黑)

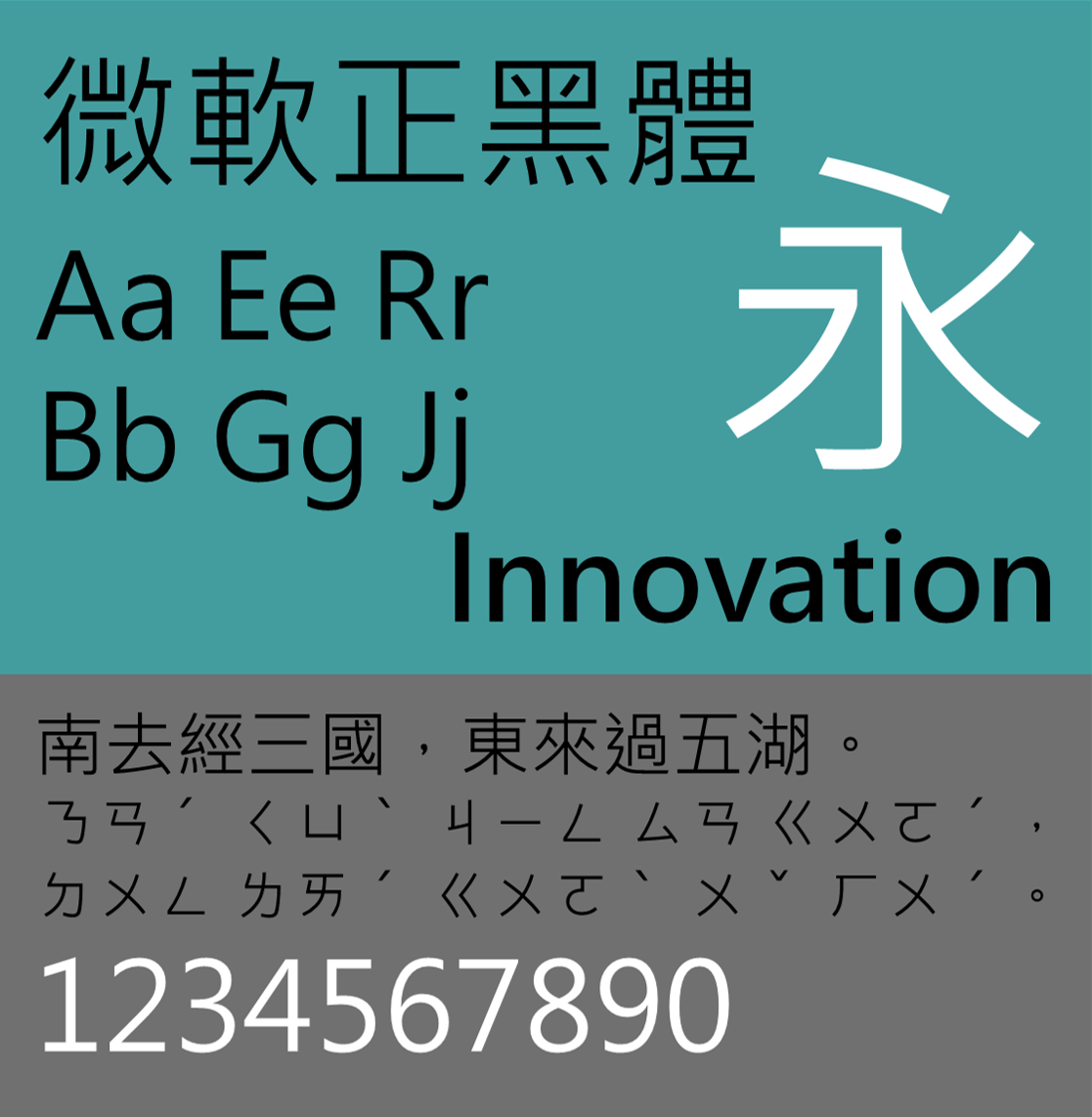
Sample of Microsoft JhengHei (微軟正黑體)

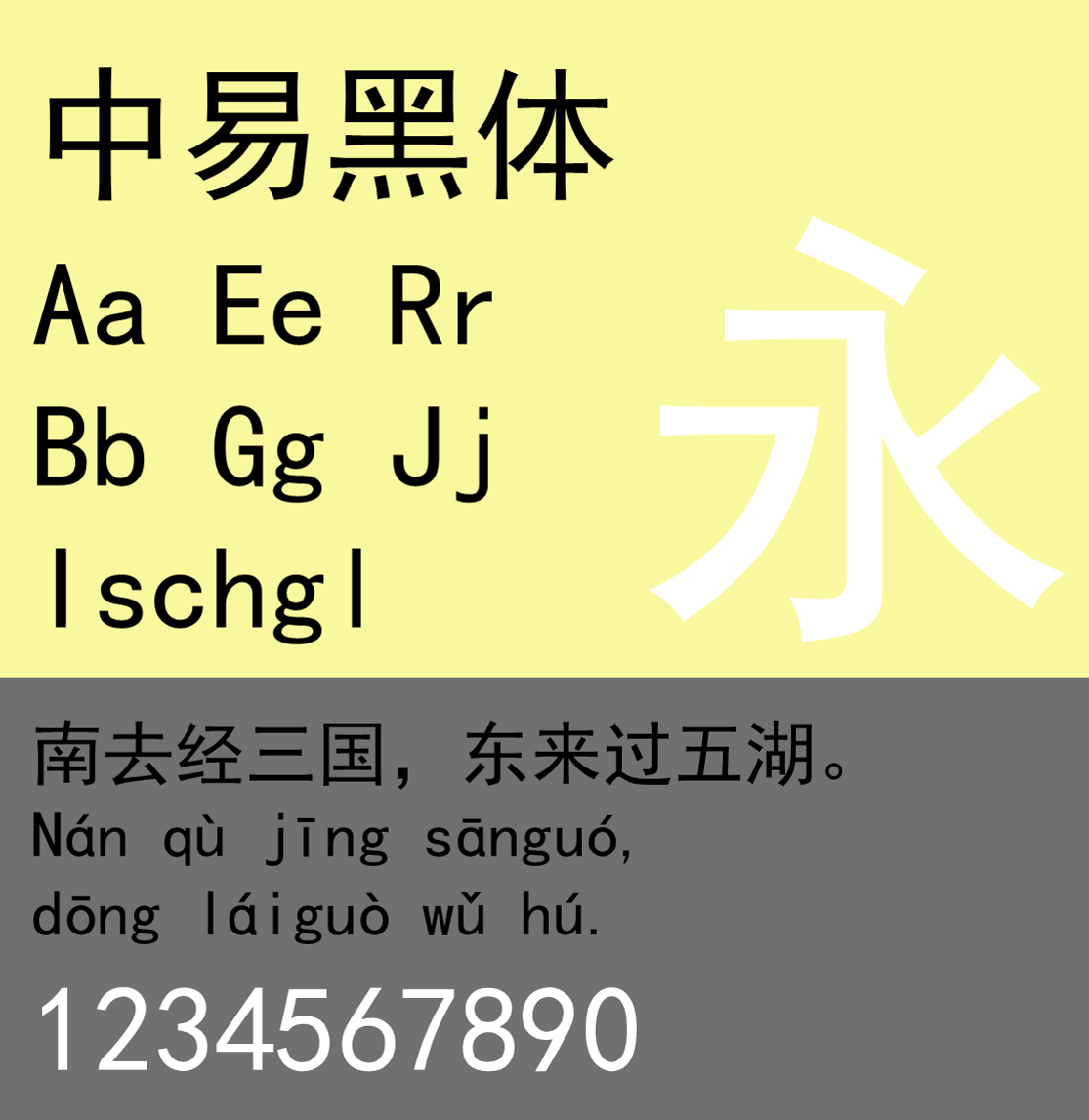
Sample of SimHei (中易雅黑), monospaced Latin characters.

A comparative display of default system fonts from major smartphone brands prominent in the Chinese market: PingFang (苹方, used by Apple), vivo Sans (vivo), MiSans (Xiaomi), OPPO Sans (OPPO), and HarmonyOS Sans (鸿蒙黑体, Huawei).

A side-by-side comparison of five system fonts prominent in the Chinese smartphone market

A comparative display of six mainstream commercial Chinese sans-serif (Hei-style) fonts from leading foundries: Monotype, Hanyi, and FounderType. The fonts featured are: M XiangHe Hei SC Pro (翔鹤黑体), Hanyi Qihei (汉仪旗黑), Hanyi Zhonghei (汉仪中黑), FounderType Yuejia Hei (方正悦驾黑), FounderType You Hei (方正悠黑), and FounderType Lanting Hei Pro Global (方正兰亭黑Pro).

Name	Localisation	Editor/Creator	Licensing	Format	Comments
WenQuanYi Zen Hei 文泉驿正黑	SC		GPL v2.0 font exception		Over 36,000 glyphs in total, among which 20,300 are Chinese characters.
WenQuanYi Micro Hei 文泉驿微米黑	SC		GPL v3 or Apache License v2		Based on Droid Sans Fallback.
PingFang SC, PingFang TC, PingFang HK 苹方-简 蘋方-繁 蘋方-港	SC, TC (Taiwan), TC (Hong Kong)				System font for Apple MacOS system.
Heiti SC, Heiti TC 黑体-简 黑體-繁	SC, TC (Taiwan)	SinoType			Was system font for OS X 10.6 Snow Leopard.
Hiragino Sans GB 冬青黑体简体中文 ヒラギノ角ゴ 簡体中文	SC				
STHeiti 华文黑体	SC	SinoType			Was system font for OS X 10.2 Jaguar to OS X 10.6 Snow Leopard.
STHeiti Light/[STXihei] 华文细黑	SC				A thinner version of STHeiti Regular.
LiHei Pro Medium 儷黑 Pro	TC (Taiwan)				
Apple LiGothic Medium 蘋果儷中黑	TC (Taiwan)				
Microsoft JhengHei 微軟正黑體	TC (Taiwan)	China Type Design Limited			Default Windows system font since Windows Vista.
Microsoft YaHei 微软雅黑	SC	Founder Type			Default Windows system font since Windows Vista. (Based on FangZheng LanTing Hei)
MS Hei; MS黑体	SC				
MHei 蒙纳黑體	TC (Hong Kong)		Commercial		Owned by Monotype
SimHei 中易黑体 or 黑体	SC				
DengXian 等线	SC				
HarmonyOS Sans SC, HarmonyOS Sans TC 鸿蒙黑体, 鴻蒙黑體	SC, TC	Huawei & Hanyi Fonts		Variable font	SC supports 27,930 characters (GB18030-2022 L1+L2), TC supports 13,078 characters. Download: official site
MiSans VF, Misans TC VF	SC, TC	Xiaomi & Hanyi Fonts		Variable font	SC supports 27,780 characters (GB18030-2022 L1+L2), TC supports 13,078 characters. Download: official site
MiSans L3	SC	Xiaomi & Hanyi Fonts		Single weight (Regular)	Supports 60,338 characters (GB18030-2022 L3). Download: official site
OPPO Sans 4.0 SC, OPPO Sans 4.0 TC	SC, TC	Oppo & Hanyi Fonts		Variable font	Version 4.0. SC supports 27,772 characters (GB18030-2022 L1+L2), TC supports 13,078 characters. Associated "Hanyi ZhongHei L3" for L3 support. Download: official site
vivo Sans SC VF, vivo Sans TW VF(vivo Sans TC VF)	SC, TC	FounderType		Variable font	SC supports 27,831 characters (GB18030-2022 L1+L2), TC supports 13,070 characters. Download: official site
vivo Sans SC L3	SC	FounderType		Single weight (Regular)	Supports 60,338 characters (GB18030-2022 L3).
HONOR Sans Design (HONOR Sans VF CN), HONOR Sans VF TC	SC, TC	FounderType		Variable font	SC supports 27,781 characters (GB18030-2022 L1+L2), TC supports 13,078 characters.Download: official site
FangZheng LanTing Hei (FZLTH) 方正兰亭黑	SC, TC	FounderType	Commercial		Released 2006. Early screen-focused family. Basis for Microsoft YaHei. Supports GB2312, GBK, GB18030-2000, GB18030-2022 L2 & L3.
FangZheng YouHei (FZYouH) 方正悠黑	SC	FounderType	Commercial		Released 2014. FounderType's 2nd gen screen font. Supports GB2312, GBK, GB18030-2000, GB18030-2022 L2.
FangZheng LanTing Hei Pro (FZLTHPro) 方正兰亭黑Pro	SC	FounderType	Commercial		Released 2017. Optimized LanTing Hei for portable HD screens. Supports GB2312, GBK, GB18030-2000, GB18030-2022 L2.
FangZheng YueJia Hei (FZYJH) 方正悦驾黑	SC	FounderType	Commercial		Released 2024. New generation screen font. Supports GB2312, GBK, GB18030-2022 L2.
Hanyi QiHei (HYQiHei) 汉仪旗黑	SC	Hanyi Fonts (汉仪字库)	Commercial		Released 2013. Modern reading efficiency with traditional calligraphic charm. Conforms to GB18030-2022 L1+L2.
M XiangHe Hei 翔鹤黑体	SC, TC	Monotype	Commercial		Released 2020. Merges traditional brush strokes (Kaishu style) with modern letterforms. Conforms to GB18030-2022 L1+L2.
Plangothic 遍黑体	SC	Fitzgerald-Porthmouth-Koenigsegg	SIL Open Font License		Based on Source Han Sans. Fills CJK Extension B to J characters. Contains ~77,000 Hanzi glyphs. Download: project page
Alibaba PuHuiTi 阿里巴巴普惠体	SC, TC, HK	Alibaba Group	No cost for commercial use, but forbids modifications		Version 3.0 was released in 2023. Fully supports GB18030-2022 standards. Level 1 & 2 supported in 7 weights; Level 3 supported in Regular. Download: official site
GWM Sans 长城共享体	SC	GWM, Monotype	No cost for commercial use, but has other restrictions preventing it from being categorized as FOSS		Font intended for use on in-vehicle car displays. Supports GB18030-2022 L2. Download: official site

=== Japanese ===
Sample of M+ OUTLINE FONTS typeface.

Sample of IPA Gothic (IPAゴシック)

Name	Editor/Creator	Licensing	Comments
IPA Gothic	Designed by Innovation Platform Agency, Japan	IPA licence	Part of the IPA font series.
Meiryo メイリオ		[FP]	Default Windows system font since Windows Vista.
Mona Font		Public domain	
M+ OUTLINE FONTS		[F] Free license	
VL Gothic; VLゴシック			
Sazanami Gothicさざなみゴシック		~~[F]~~ Formerly considered free and included with a number of Linux distributions.	
MS Gothic; MS ゴシック			Distributed on Microsoft Windows 3.1 and later.
MS PGothic; MS Pゴシック			Distributed on Microsoft Windows 95 and later.
MS UI Gothic			Distributed on Microsoft Windows 98 and later.
Yu Gothic 游ゴシック			Distributed by Microsoft Windows 8.1.
Yu Gothic UI			Distributed by Microsoft Windows 8.1.
Osaka			Distributed on Classic Mac OS.
Hiragino Kaku Gothic ヒラギノ角ゴ			Distributed on Mac OS X.
Hiragino Maru Gothic ヒラギノ丸ゴ			Distributed on Mac OS X.
Kozuka Gothic 小塚ゴシック			Typeface family provided by new versions of Adobe Illustrator.
GothicBBB-Medium	Adobe		
Kochi Gothic 東風ゴシック		~~[F]~~	Originally named Watanabe font (渡邊フォント). Formerly considered free that is included with a number of Linux distributions. The development of the font stopped when it was discovered that Watanabe font – which Kochi Gothic based on – was copied from the TypeBank Mincho-M font, developed by TypeBank and Design Laboratory, Hitachi, Ltd.

=== Korean ===
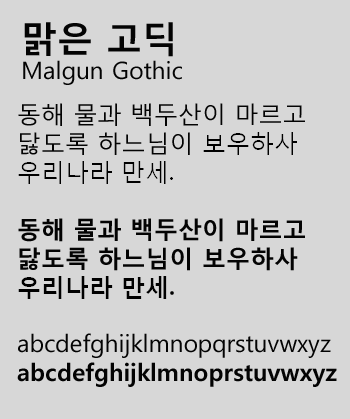
Sample of Malgun Gothic typeface.

English name	CJK name	Editor/Creator	Licensing	Comments
AppleGothic	애플고딕			Fully supports Unicode from Mac OS X 10.5 Leopard
Dotum	돋움			
DotumChe	돋움체			Monospace font.
Gulim	굴림			
GulimChe	굴림체			Monospace font.
Malgun Gothic	맑은 고딕			
New Gulim	새굴림			
Gulim Old Hangul Jamo				
Apple SD Gothic Neo	애플 SD 산돌고딕 Neo			
UnDotum	은돋움		GPL	Un-series fonts initially derived from Korean LaTeX fonts with the same name.
UnShinmun	은신문		GPL	Un-series fonts initially derived from Korean LaTeX fonts with the same name.
Baekmuk Gulim	백묵굴림		[F]	
Seoul Namsan	서울남산체	Seoul Metropolitan Government.		
Nanum Gothic	나눔고딕	Distributed by Naver.	Open Font License	Nanum-series fonts.
Hamchorom Dotum	함초롬돋움	Designed by Hancom.	[F]	Supporting Unicode from 1.0 to 5.0 and Hangul Jamo Extended A/B.
Jieubsida Dodum	지읍시다돋움		GPL	

=== Vietnamese ===
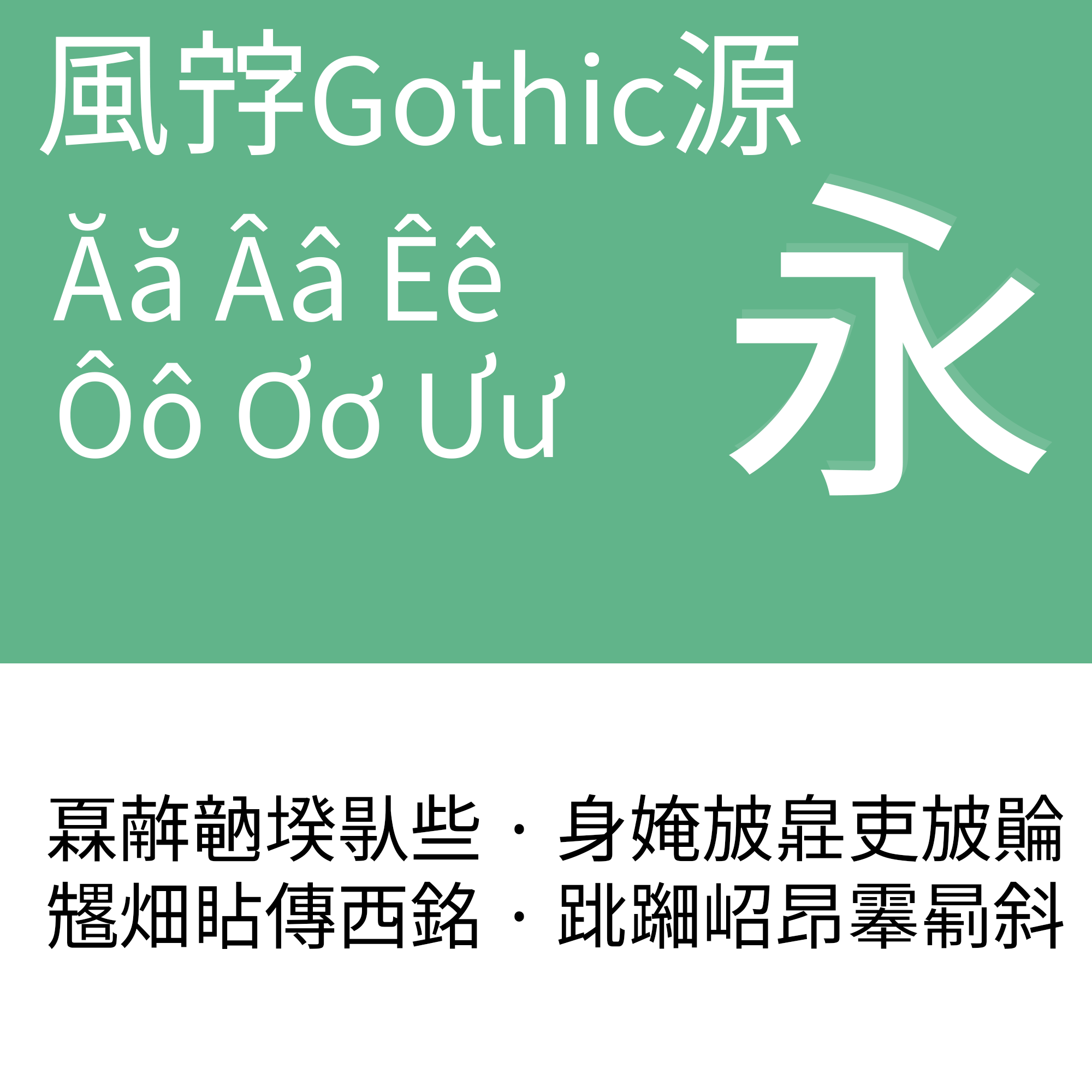
Sample of Gothic Nguyên

Name	Editor/Creator	Licensing	Format	Comments
Han-Nom Gothic 1.40	UBPSHNVN			35,733 characters with 36,306 glyphs
Gothic Nguyen 1.21	UBPSHNVN			

== Regular script ==
Sample of Regular script typeface. Shown above are the characters 漢字 (Pinyin: Hànzì), meaning "Chinese characters".

=== Chinese ===
Name	Localisation	Editor/Creator	Licensing	Comments
Adobe Kaiti Std; Adobe楷体	SC/TC	Adobe, Sandoll Communications	Commercial	Bundled with Adobe products. Supports both SC and TC glyphs.
BiaoKai, KaiU, DFKai-SB 標楷體	TC (Taiwan)	DynaComware	Commercial	Distributed with Microsoft Windows 95 & higher, and Apple OS X up to Yosemite. Known as BiauKai on macOS.
DFK LiKai 華康儷楷書	TC	DynaComware	Commercial	A popular typeface from DynaFont (華康字型) series.
DFK KaiShu 華康楷書體	TC	DynaComware	Commercial	A standard Kai script typeface from DynaFont series.
FZ Jiaocai Guifan Kaiti 方正教材规范楷体	SC	FounderType	Commercial	A Kaiti typeface designed to meet the standards for educational materials in mainland China.
FZ KaiTi 方正楷体	SC	FounderType	Commercial	A classic Kaiti typeface from Founder. Often used in publishing and printing.
FZNewKai 方正新楷体: FZKaiS-Extended, FZKaiS-Extended(SIP); FZKaiT-Extended, FZKaiT-Extended(SIP)	SC, TC (SC style)	FounderType	Commercial	Initial set released in 2006. 28,928 glyphs in the basic BMP fonts plus another 54,328 in the SIP fonts.
Hanyi Kaiti 汉仪楷体	SC	Hanyi (汉仪字库)	Commercial	A popular Kaiti typeface from Hanyi Fonts.
SimKai, KaiTi 中易楷体 楷体_GB2312	SC	Beijing Zhongyi Electronics Co. (中易电子)	Commercial	Distributed on Chinese versions of Microsoft Windows.
STKaiti 华文楷体	SC	SinoType	Commercial	Distributed with Microsoft Windows and macOS.
TW-Kai, TW-Kai-Ext-B, TW-Kai-Plus 全字庫正楷體	TC (Taiwan)	Ministry of Education, Taiwan	Open Government Data License v1.0, equivalent to CC-BY 4.0 International license	100,000+ characters covering CNS 11643. TW-Kai covers the characters mapped to the Basic Multilingual Plane, TW-Kai-Ext-B covers CJK Unified Ideographs Extension B, and TW-Kai-Plus covers Private Use Area mapped characters.
I.Ngaan; I.顏體	TC	Keshilu (刻石錄)	~~[F]~~[F] GPL 2.0+	Derived from a Yan styled typeface by Wang Hanzong (王漢宗). As Wang Hanzong fonts are suspected to be copyright infringement, this derived font is considered copyright infringement too.
Free HK Kai 自由香港楷書	TC (Hong Kong)	Free Hong Kong Font (自由香港字型) project	CC-BY 4.0 International license	Based on TW-Kai, following List of Glyphs of Commonly Used Characters (常用字字形表) by Education Bureau of Hong Kong SAR.

=== Japanese ===
Name	Localisation	Editor/Creator	Licensing	Comments
Klee One クレーOne	JP	FONTWORKS	SIL OFL 1.1	A transitional handwritten style between Kai (regular script) and Fangsong. Has been developed into simplified Chinese font LxgwWenKai (霞鹜文楷), Taiwanese Traditional Chinese font iansui (芫荽) and Hong Kong Traditional Chinese font JyunsaiKaai (芫茜雅楷).

=== Vietnamese ===
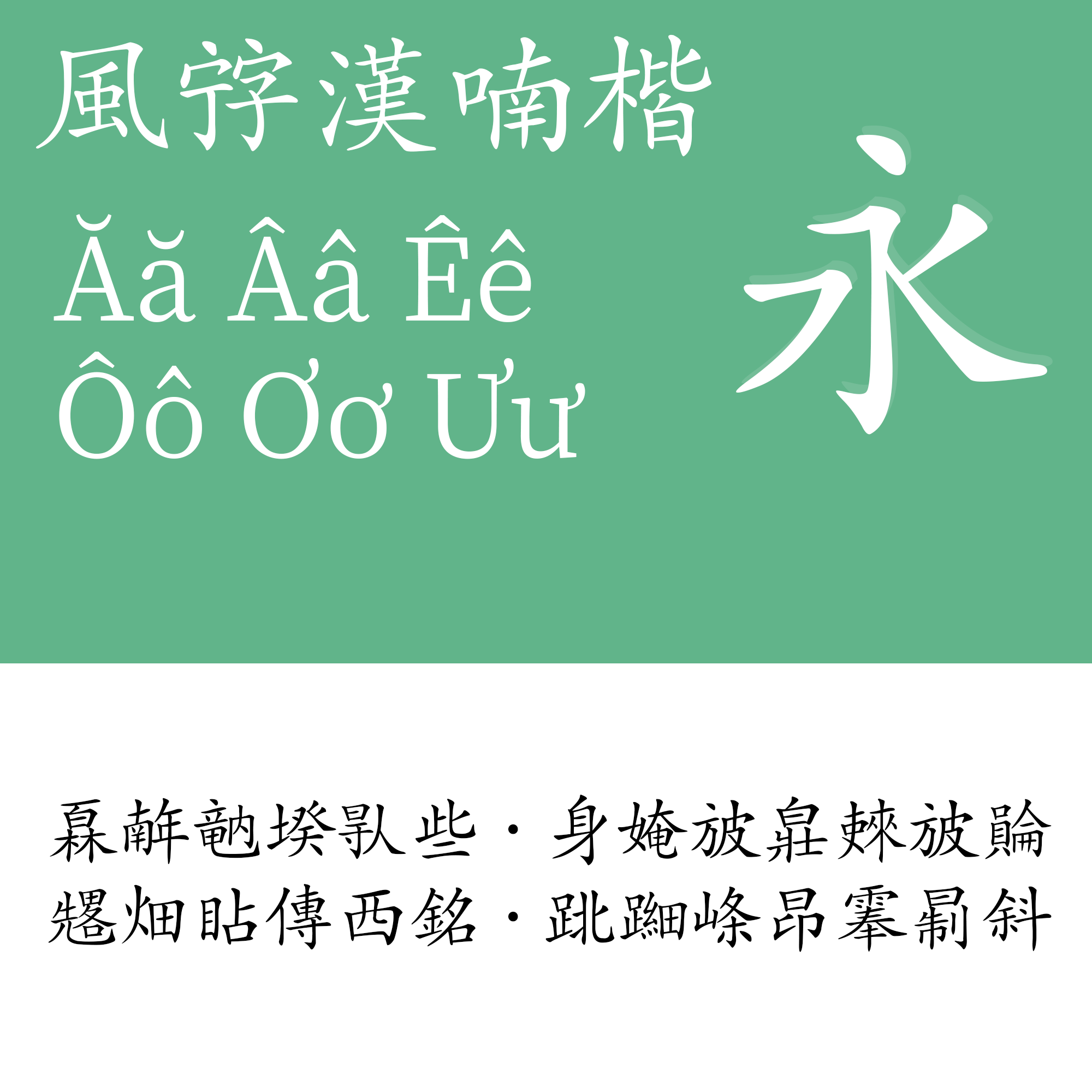
Sample of Han-Nom Khai

English name	CJK name	Editor/Creator	Licensing	Comments
Han-Nom Khai 1.20	漢喃楷 1.20	UBPSHNVN		28,147 characters with 28,145 glyphs

== Clerical script ==
English name	Localisation	Editor/Creator	Licensing	Comments
SimLi 中易隶书 or 隶书	SC			Distributed with the Chinese version of Microsoft Office.
UnYetgul 은옛글	Korean		[F]	One of Un-series fonts initially derived from the Korean LaTeX fonts.

== Imitation Song ==
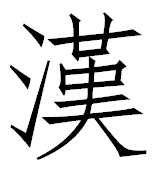
Traditional Chinese character "Hàn" (漢) in an Imitation Song typeface.

Name	Localisation	Editor/Creator	Licensing	Comments
Adobe Fangsong	SC, TC, JP	Adobe Inc.	Free both for personal and commercial use, but is not open source.	Bundled with Adobe products, but can be purchased individually.
FangSong 中易仿宋, 仿宋 (display name)	SC	Microsoft		Distributed with the Chinese version of Microsoft Windows.
STFangsong 华文仿宋	SC	SinoType		Formerly distributed with Mac 10.4.
Zhuque Fangsong 朱雀仿宋	SC	TrionesType	SIL OFL 1.1	Reportedly the first open-source Fangsong font.

== Other fonts or projects ==
=== Pan-Unicode/Pan-CJK ===
English name	Localisation	Editor/Creator	Style	Licensing	Comments
GNU Unifont	Pan-Unicode			[F]	A GPLed bitmap font that covers the Unicode Basic Multilingual Plane.
Code2000	Pan-Unicode				

=== Chinese ===
Name	Localisation	Editor/Creator	Style	Licensing	Comments
SimYou 幼圆	SC	Microsoft	Rounded		Distributed with Chinese version of Microsoft Office.
WenQuanYi Unibit	SC	WenQuanYi font project	Bitmap	GPL	A bitmap monospaced font.
Shuowen Jiezi True Type Font 說文解字True Type字型	Chinese		Script		Most/all of the characters are small seal script. It is based on annotated Shuowen Jiezi and other sources.
Chong Xi Small Seal 崇羲篆體	Chinese	Academia Sinica	Script	CC-BY-ND-3.0-TW-or-later	Most/all of the characters are small seal script. It is based on annotated Shuowen Jiezi and other sources.
I.PenCrane; I.鋼筆鶴體	TC (General)	Keshilu (刻石錄)	Script	GPL 2.0+	Derived from a handwriting styled typeface by Wang Hanzong (王漢宗). As Wang Hanzong fonts are suspected to be copyright infringement, this derived font is considered copyright infringement too.
Open Huninn; Open 粉圓	TC (General)	Justfont	Rounded	SIL Open Font License	Derived from MOTOYA Kosugi Maru font.
Ma Shan Zheng	SC	Ma Shan Zheng Project	Script	SIL Open Font License	Derived from the font used to display "yinglian", a type of duilian typically displayed on the sides of doors or entryways.

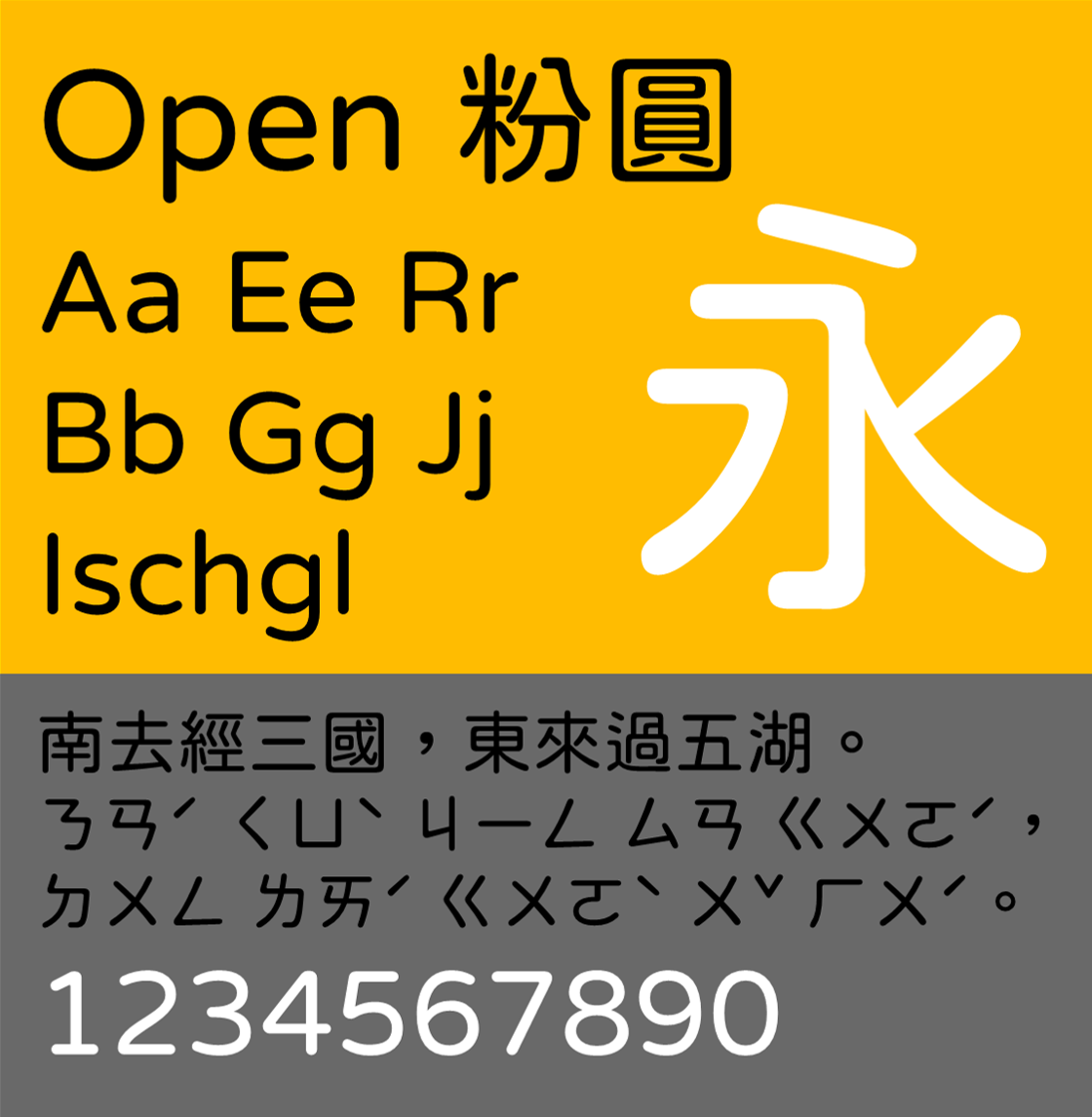
Sample of Open Huninn (Open 粉圓)

=== Japanese ===
English name	Editor/Creator	Style	Licensing	Comments
Mojikyō; 文字鏡				
Y.OzFontN		Handwriting		
Kanji Stroke Order Font 漢字の筆順のフォント		Handwriting	[F]	
Choumei		Handwriting	[F]	Kanji Stroke Order Font with the stroke numbers omitted

=== Korean ===
English name	CJK name	Editor/Creator	Style	Licensing	Comments
UnGungseo	은궁서		Calligraphy	[F]	Part of Un-series.
Jieubsida Sun-Moon	지읍시다선문		"Felt marker style"	GPL	Offshoot of the Tsukurimashou meta-family, built using METAFONT.

=== Font series ===
This section lists fonts that are designed to be used together, or created by the same person/organization such that it forms a series of fonts.

English name	Localisation	Editor/Creator	Style	Licensing	Comments
HanWang Series 王漢宗字体系列	TC	Wang Hanzong (王漢宗), NTU.		~~[F]~~ GPL	42 fonts. Wang is involved in copyright infringement with Arphic Technology for the fonts in 2005.
Arphic PL Fonts series: AR PL Mingti2L Big5 文鼎 PL 細上海宋; AR PL KaitiM Big5 文鼎 PL 中楷; AR PL SungtiL GB 文鼎 PL 簡報宋; AR PL KaitiM GB 文鼎 PL 簡中楷	TC (General), SC	Arphic foundry	Ming/Song, Regular script	1999 Arphic Public License	4 fonts. The CJK Unifonts project was derived from Arphic PL Fonts.
CJK Unifonts series: AR PL UMing; AR PL UKai	SC	CJKUnifonts	Ming/Song, Regular script	Arphic Public License	2 fonts. AR PL UMing is formerly known as AR PL ShanHeiSun Uni, AR PL 上海宋. AR PL UKai is formerly known as AR PL ZenKai, AR PL 中楷. This is a project under CJK Unifonts, which is included with a number of Linux distributions. (Note: Archived copies also available at the Internet Archive Wayback Machine: ttf-arphic-uming_0.2.20080216.1.orig.tar.gz, ttf-arphic-ukai_0.2.20080216.1.orig.tar.gz) Merger of typefaces in Arphic PL Fonts.
AR PL MingU20-L 文鼎 PL 明體 AR PL BaoSong2GBK 文鼎 PL 報宋	TC (Taiwan), SC	Arphic foundry	Ming/Song	2010 Arphic Public License (Restricted NC-ND)	2 fonts. License: explicitly restrict distribution of the original or modified font to "only for non-profit purpose". (Note: Archived copies also available at the Internet Archive Wayback Machine: 文鼎科技發佈新的公眾授權字型)
Fandol series: Fandol Song; Fandol Hei; Fandol Kai; Fandol Fang	SC		From top to bottom: Ming/Song; Sans-serif; Regular script; Imitation Song	~~[F]~~[F] GPL with font exception	4 fonts, both Fandol Song and Fandol Hei has two weights (regular/bold). Originally for CTeX, there is debate on whether the font is FOSS as the author may have revoked the license.
cwTeX series: cwTeX 仿宋體 (Imitation Song); cwTeX 圓體 (Rounded); cwTeX 明體 (Ming); cwTeX 楷書 (Regular script); cwTeX 粗黑體 (Sans-serif)	TC		From top to bottom: Imitation Song; Rounded; Ming/Song; Regular script; Sans-serif	~~[F]~~[F] GPL, later SIL OFL	5 fonts. Originally for LaTeX CJK. The Bold Sans-serif has been involved in copyright infringement with Arphic Technology, while the Ming font is found out to be similar to pre-existing font.
Nanum Series: Nanum Pen / Nanum Brush 나눔 손글씨	Korean	Distributed by Naver.		Open Font License	
Un-series	Korean				Series of Korean fonts derived from LaTeX fonts.

== Font foundries ==
This section lists major font foundries that produce CJK fonts.

1. SinoType Technology (Chinese: 中国常州华文印刷新技术有限公司)
2. Founder Group (Chinese: 方正)
3. Hanyi Fonts (Chinese: 汉仪科印)
4. DynaLab by DynaComware (Chinese: 華康)
5. Arphic (Chinese: 文鼎科技)
6. Justfont (Chinese: 就是字)

== See also ==
- Chinese input methods for computers
- Free software Unicode typefaces
- Japanese input methods
- Keyboard layout
- Korean language and computers
- List of typefaces
- Unicode typeface
