= Leelawadee =

Leelawadee may refer to:

- a flowering shrub known primarily as Plumeria or frangipani
- a font for the Thai script present on Microsoft Windows systems, related to Segoe UI: see Segoe § Other related fonts
