= Mona (font) =

Series of Japanese typeface

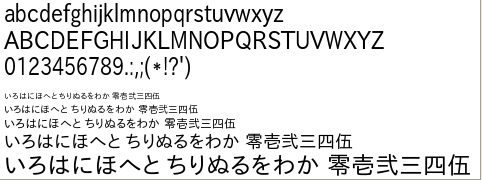
A screenshot of IPAMonaPGothic

Mona is both a Japanese proportional pixel font for the X Window System, derived from the Shinonome raster font family, and a TrueType font. It aims to represent Shift JIS art graphics properly, almost all of which require the MS PGothic font. Mona is named after Mona, a character-based mascot of 2channel.

Mona uses glyphs from Shinonome (東雲) version 0.9.9 (Gothic) for embedded bitmaps. In version 2.30-pre, it incorporated outlines from Kochi-Gothic. However, it was changed to Kochi-substitute in 2.30-pre2 after discovering that Kochi font violates copyright. After this, the glyphs in Mona resemble those in MS PGothic.

Mona supports the following code pages: 1252 (Latin 1), 1250 (Latin 2: East Europe), 1251 (Cyrillic), 1253 (Greek), 932 (JIS/Japan), 737 (Greek; former 437G), 437 (US).

== mona-outline ==
mona-outline version 2.30pre2 is included with the source code for the Mona Font source package, which consists of a subset of glyphs found in Mona. The OpenType layout table supports standard ligatures in the default language. When the font is viewed under Windows Font Viewer, a horizontal stroke overlays the glyph.

mona-outline supports the following code pages: 932 (JIS/Japan), 437 (US).

== IPA monafont ==
IPA monafont is an extension of IPA Font (IPAフォント), Sazanami Font (さざなみフォント), Mona Font (モナーフォント), M+ Fonts (M+フォント) created by Jun Kobayashi, which consists of a family of fonts:

- IPAMonaGothic (IPA モナー ゴシック)
- IPAMonaMincho (IPA モナー 明朝)
- IPAMonaPGothic (IPA モナー P ゴシック)
- IPAMonaPMincho (IPA モナー P 明朝)
- IPAMonaUIGothic (IPA モナー UI ゴシック)

The IPA monafont family supports the following code pages: 1252 (Latin 1), 1251 (Cyrillic), 932 (JIS/Japan), 950 (Big-5), Macintosh Character Set (US Roman), Windows OEM Character Set, 866 (MS-DOS Russian), 865 (MS-DOS Nordic), 863 (MS-DOS Canadian French), 861 (MS-DOS Icelandic), 860 (MS-DOS Portuguese), 855 (IBM Cyrillic; primary Russian), 437 (US).

Glyphs for CJK ideographs are reworked to look more like Arial Unicode MS, while sub-glyphs for these characters are repositioned and rescaled. Similar to the MS Gothic and MS Mincho font families, its reverse solidus glyph uses a yen sign instead of a backslash. A similar non-standard substitution can be found in the Gulim and Dotum font families.

== Font statistics ==
	Font						
Unicode Code Range	IPAMonaGothic	IPAMonaMincho	IPAMonaPGothic	IPAMonaPMincho	IPAMonaUIGothic	Mona	mona-outline
Arrows	6	6	6	6	6	6	0
Basic Latin	96	96	95	97	96	96	95
Box Drawing	32	32	32	32	32	32	0
CJK Compatibility	28	28	28	28	28	28	0
CJK Compatibility Ideographs	34	34	34	34	34	8	0
CJK Symbols and Punctuation	24	24	24	25	24	24	15
CJK Unified Ideographs	6682	6682	6682	6682	6682	6426	0
Cyrillic	66	66	66	70	66	66	0
Enclosed Alphanumerics	20	20	20	20	20	20	0
Enclosed CJK Letters and Months	8	8	8	8	8	8	0
General Punctuation	15	14	29	30	14	17	9
Geometric Shapes	12	12	12	12	12	12	0
Greek and Coptic	48	48	48	48	48	48	0
Halfwidth and Fullwidth Forms	163	163	163	163	163	163	136
Hiragana	87	87	87	87	87	87	57
Katakana	90	90	90	90	90	90	79
Latin-1 Supplement	95	95	95	95	95	9	3
Letterlike Symbols	4	4	4	4	4	5	1
Mathematical Operators	37	36	37	36	36	36	0
Miscellaneous Symbols	7	7	7	7	7	8	0
Miscellaneous Technical	1	1	1	1	1	1	0
Number Forms	20	20	20	20	20	20	0
Optical Character Recognition	0	0	0	0	0	1	0
Totals	IPAMonaGothic	IPAMonaMincho	IPAMonaPGothic	IPAMonaPMincho	IPAMonaUIGothic	Mona	mona-outline
Number of characters	7575	7573	7588	7595	7573	7211	395
Number of glyphs	12925	8716	9491	8738	9305	7226	398

Note: Some glyphs representing non-whitespace characters are blank.

== See also ==
- List of CJK fonts
