= M+ FONTS =

Series of Japanese typeface

- Category: Sans Serif, Monospace
- Designer: Coji Morishita (森下 浩司)
- Foundry: M+ FONTS PROJECT
- Date created: November 2003
- Date released: December 2003 (TESTFLIGHT-001); 2017-10-25 v 063
- Variations: 7 proportional weights from thin to black 5 monospaced weights from thin to bold 2 kana curve styles
- Website: https://mplusfonts.github.io/

M+ FONTS is a series of Japanese fonts designed by Coji Morishita. The "M" stands for "minimum", while the plus sign means "above minimum".

== Fonts ==
=== Vector ===
The "M^{+} OUTLINE FONTS" are of a Gothic sans-serif style, with proportional and monospaced fonts and many different weights, ranging from thin to black. The fonts support the following character sets: C0 controls and basic Latin, Latin-1 Supplement, Latin Extended-A, Japanese kana, and Japanese kanji. The fonts are developed using FontForge. The current version contains over 4600 glyphs.

==== Nomenclature ====
M^{+} vector fonts are named as such: M^{+} followed by 1 or 2, and then optionally P (proportional), C (optimized for typesetting), M (monospaced), and MN (monospaced high-visibility variant for programming use). The numbers denote glyph design styles, while the letters denote Latin glyph configurations.

Each Type 2 font has several glyphs that differ from its respective Type 1 font. Kana & Latin-style numbering. Japanese glyphs are fullwidth, and kanji glyphs are identical between variants of the same weight. Proportional Latin fonts are available in thin, light, regular, medium, bold, heavy, and black weights, and fixed halfwidth Latin fonts are available in thin, light, regular, medium, and bold weights.

=== Raster ===
The "M^{+} BITMAP FONTS" are raster fonts originally developed in 2002.

- Japanese and Latin: All Japanese glyphs occupy full-width cells. Fonts are made in heights of 10 and 12 pixels in regular and bold weights.
  - M^{+} gothic: Japanese with half-width Latin glyphs.
  - M^{+} goth_p: Japanese with proportional Latin glyphs.
- Latin only
  - M^{+} fxd: consists of fixed-width glyphs. Has a height of 10 and 12 pixels in regular and bold weights.
  - M^{+} hlv: a replacement of Helvetica. Has a height of 10 and 12 pixels in regular and bold weights.
  - M^{+} sys: designed for user interfaces. Has a height of 10 pixels in regular and bold weights.
  - M^{+} qub: a regular-weight miniature font with a height of 6 pixels.

== Accolades ==
The M^{+} font family was selected as one of the "free fonts of the month" in Smashing Magazine and as a SourceForge "Project of the Month". It has also been selected as one of eight "excellent" fonts for print and screen.

== License ==
Early versions of M+ used a pseudo-license disclaimer that effectively disowned any copyright:

These fonts are free software.

Unlimited permission is granted to use, copy, and distribute them, with or without modification, either commercially or noncommercially.

THESE FONTS ARE PROVIDED "AS IS" WITHOUT WARRANTY.

The version released in 2019 under cooperation with Google Fonts uses the Open Font License.
