= Arphic Technology =

Arphic Technology Co., Ltd.
- Native name: 文鼎科技開發股份有限公司
- Romanized name: Wéndǐng Kējì Kāifā Gǔfèn Yǒuxiàn Gōngsī
- Type: Type foundry
- Founded: May 1990; 36 years ago
- Headquarters: New Taipei, Taiwan
- Total assets: NT$90 million
- Number of employees: 70
- Parent: Morisawa Inc.
- Website: www.arphic.com.tw

Arphic Technology Co., Ltd. (Chinese: 文鼎科技開發股份有限公司), or Arphic Technology (文鼎科技), is a type foundry based in New Taipei, Taiwan founded in May 1990.

== Fonts ==
=== Arphic PL Fonts ===
Arphic PL Fonts
- Developer: Arphic Technology
- Release: 1999 & 2010
- Type: Computer font
- License: AR PL KaitiM, AR PL Mingti2L, AR PL SungtiL, AR PL KaitiM GB: Arphic Public License (2001 version, free license); AR PL MingU20-L, AR PL BaoSong2GBK: Arphic Public License (revised 2010 version, non-commercial)
- Website: www.arphic.com.tw

Arphic Technology is the creator of the Arphic PL Fonts (where "PL" means "public license(d)", or in Chinese: 文鼎公眾授權字型 or 文鼎自由字型). The fonts include AR PL KaitiM Big5 (文鼎 PL 中楷), AR PL Mingti2L Big5 (文鼎 PL 細上海宋), AR PL SungtiL GB (文鼎 PL 簡報宋) and AR PL KaitiM GB (文鼎 PL 簡中楷), which were released in 1999 under the Arphic Public License. They are used by Debian-derived Linux distributions (such as Ubuntu), as well as by most LaTeX distributions, as part of their default CJK fonts.

In 2010, Arphic Technology released another two fonts, AR PL MingU20-L (文鼎 PL 明體) and AR PL BaoSong2GBK (文鼎 PL 報宋), which are available under a revised Arphic Public License that restricts distribution of the fonts to non-profit use only.

=== Meiryo ===
As a partner of C&G Inc., Arphic Technology was one of the designers of kanji in C&G's Meiryo font, intended for Japanese.

== Arphic Public License ==
Arphic Public License (1999 version)
- Publisher: Arphic Technology
- Published: 1999
- FSF approved: Yes
- GPL compatible: No
- Copyleft: Yes
- Website: A copy of the license text on GNU.org

The "Arphic Public License" published by Arphic Technology in 1999 was recognized by Free Software Foundation as a copyleft, free software license and incompatible with the GNU General Public License. But as it is used almost only for fonts, the incompatibility does not cause a problem in that use.

The revised Arphic Public License published in 2010 doesn't allow commercial use, thus is non-free.

== See also ==
- List of CJK fonts
- List of companies of Taiwan
