= Shift JIS art =

Artwork

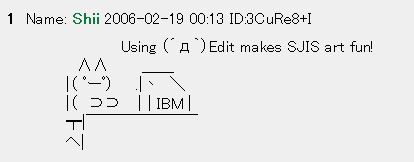
An example of Shift_JIS art, depicting a cat sitting at a computer

Shift_JIS art is artwork created from characters in the Shift JIS character set, a superset of the ASCII encoding standard intended for Japanese usage. Shift_JIS art has become popular on web-based bulletin boards, notably 2channel, and has even made its way into mainstream media and commercial advertising in Japan.

== In Japanese media ==
The Shift JIS character set is a Japanese Industrial Standards (JIS) superset of JIS X 0201 (in turn almost a superset of ASCII) intended for Japanese usage. Unlike Western ASCII art, which is generally designed to be viewed with a monospaced font, Shift_JIS art is designed around the proportional-width MS PGothic font supplied with Microsoft Windows, which is the default font for web sites in Japanese versions of Windows. This dependency has led to the development of the free Mona Font, in which each character is the same width as its counterpart in MS PGothic. This is useful on operating systems lacking the proprietary PGothic font by default, such as Linux.

Within the Japanese community, Shift_JIS art is sometimes abbreviated as SJIS art, but is most commonly referred to as "AA" meaning ASCII art, although it rarely restricts itself to the 95 printable characters within the ASCII standard. As with ANSI art, SJIS art is sometimes used for animation. However, due to technical advances, SJIS art also appears in the form of Adobe Flash files and animated GIFs.

The Japanese movie and television show, Densha Otoko (電車男), frequently included Shift_JIS art, both during screen transitions and within the story itself. One of the recurring characters in the TV series was a Shift_JIS artist who would often draw full-screen Shift_JIS works of art as a way of expressing his support and encouraging the lead character. When they got engaged, posts began flowing in congratulating the new couple, and extravagant Shift JIS art pictures were posted.

The Touhou Project meme "Yukkuri shiteitte ne!!!" traces back to Shift JIS art of Reimu Hakurei's outfit in Curiosities of Lotus Asia that was posted to 2channel's "Touhou Series General Thread" on December 5, 2003. The artwork was later edited and rendered to a head, which someone increased the size of on April 18, 2004, but it was not really noticed until someone started posting the artwork in the Japanese BBS rental board Shitaraba's Immaterial and Missing Power threads on May 28, 2007. Of course, the head was made fun of, but a few weeks later, users started making edits or variations of the text-based head. It is known what the Marisa head is based on, but it is unclear when the two Shift JIS art was combined or where the "Yukkuri shiteitte ne!!!" phrase was appended to the heads.

== Gallery ==
Giko neko (ギコネコ, gikoneko) Posted on ja:あやしいわーるど (あやしいわーるど, AyashīWārudo)/ja:あやしいわーるど@本店 (本店(昼の部), HontenHiruNoBu) in 1997

Giko neko (ギコ猫, gikoneko) Posted on 2channel (２ちゃんねる, Nichanneru) in 1999

Monā (モナー, Monā) Posted on 2channel (２ちゃんねる, Nichanneru) in 2000.

Posted on ja:あやしいわーるどII (あやしいわーるどII, AyashīWārudoAiai) in 2000.

BearBear--!!! (くまくま━━━━━━ヽ（ ・(ｪ)・ ）ノ━━━━━━ !!!, KumaKumā--!!!)Posted on 2channel (２ちゃんねる, Nichanneru) in 2003. YukkuriShiteIttene!!! (ゆっくりしていってね!!!, YukkuriShiteIttene!!!) Posted on 2channel (２ちゃんねる, Nichanneru) in 2007

Anti2ch

逝ってよし(ItteYoshi) means "you can die." It is Japanese slang.

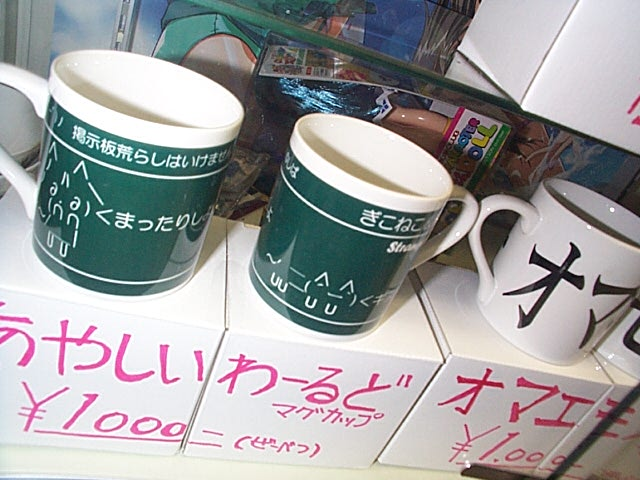
AA character goods The first consumer product with dōjin.

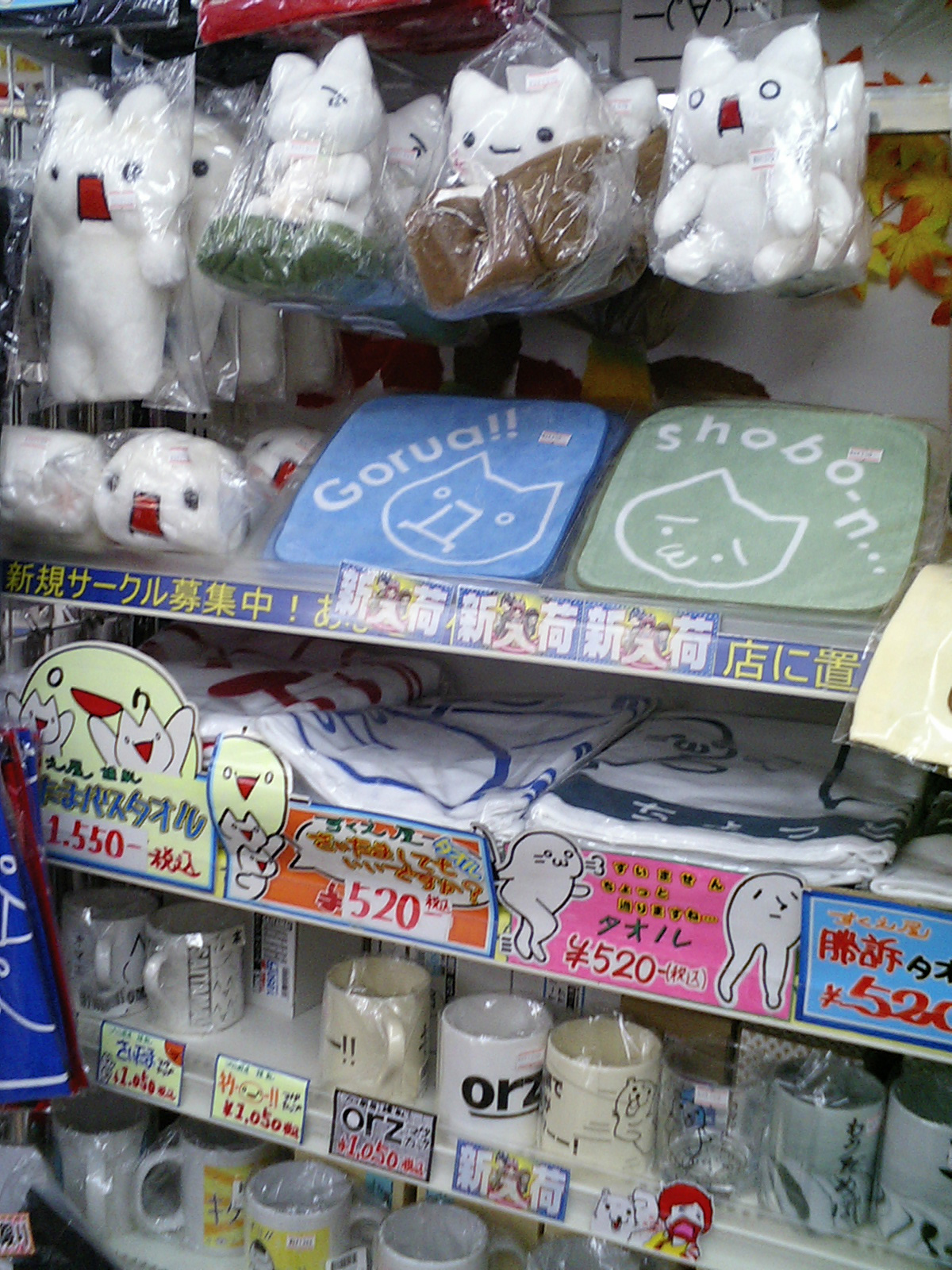
2ch goods with dōjin.

== See also ==
- ASCII art
- ANSI art
- Japanese emoticons
- Mona Font
