= Malgun Gothic =

Korean typeface

Malgun Gothic (맑은 고딕)
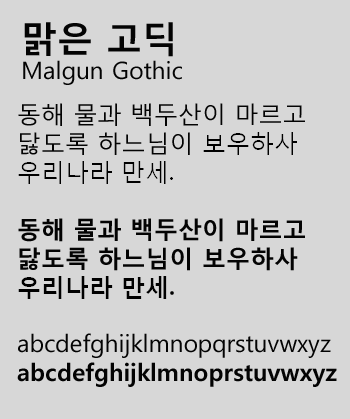
- Category: Sans-serif
- Designers: Kyoung-bae Lee, Daekwon Kim
- Foundry: Sandoll Communications
- Design based on: Segoe UI

Malgun Gothic (Korean: 맑은 고딕; RR: Malgeun Godik) is a Korean sans-serif typeface developed by Sandoll Communications, with hinting by Monotype Imaging, as a replacement of Dotum and Gulim as the default system font for the Korean language. It was first shipped with Windows Vista, being available to download later for Windows XP users. The name "malgun" means "clear" in Korean, thus making a direct translation of the font's name "Clear Gothic."

== Characteristics ==
The font uses Segoe UI for Latin text, while the Korean glyphs are created based on the typeface of Hunminjeongeum, and streamlined with modern form of characters as well as upright and well-regulated strokes. The font supports KS X 1001 character set, but unlike Dotum and Gulim, there are no Han ideographic glyphs (Windows will pull from the Gulim hanja set instead) initially, and the fonts do not include half-width fixed Latin glyphs. There are hanja designed for Malgun Gothic by ChinaType Design, Monotype Imaging Inc. and they were released when Windows 8 released. The glyphs are not rounded at the terminals.

Windows Vista includes two roman weights of the font.

Windows 10 changed glyph characteristics.

== See also ==
- East Asian gothic typeface
- New Gulim
- Sans-serif
- Microsoft
- List of CJK fonts
- Meiryo
- Microsoft JhengHei
- Microsoft YaHei
