= Nanum fonts =

Series of Korean typeface

Nanum Gothic
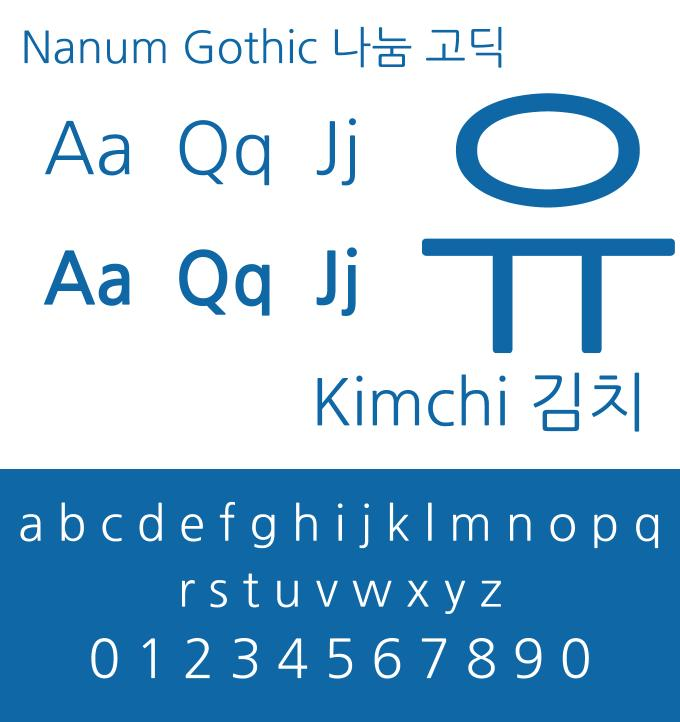
- Category: Sans-serif
- Designers: Sandoll, Naver
- Foundry: Naver
- License: SIL Open Font License

The Nanum fonts (Korean: 나눔글꼴; RR: Nanum Geulkkol) is a series of open source unicode fonts designed for the Korean language, designed by Sandoll Communications and Fontrix (폰트릭스). It includes a sans serif (gothic), serif (myeongjo), monospace (coding), pen script, and brush script typefaces. It was published and distributed by Naver.

It is the basic Korean font of Ubuntu Linux since version 12.04. The five Nanum fonts are also included in Mac OS X 10.7 Lion.

== Variations ==
=== Nanum Gothic ===
It was designed by Sandoll Communications and released in 2008–2011. It has three weights without Italics.

=== Nanum Gothic Coding ===
It is similar with Nanum Gothic but is designed for developers to use easily. It was released in 2009. It is the monospaced edition of Nanum Gothic. It has two weights without Italics.

=== Nanum Myeongjo ===
It was designed by Fontrix and released in 2008. It has three weights without Italics

=== Nanum handwriting (brush and pen) ===
It consists of two types of handwriting, brush and pen. It was included with the Nanum Fonts 3.0 version.

=== Nanum Gothic Eco and Nanum Myeongjo Eco ===
It was developed by technical tie-up with Ecofont BV. It was designed to save ink on printers.

== See also ==
- Myongjo
- Noto Fonts (Korean is Noto Sans KR and Noto Serif KR)
