= DynaComware =

Type foundry company based in Taiwan

DynaComware Corporation
- Native name: 威鋒數位開發股份有限公司
- Formerly: DynaLab Inc.
- Founded: 1987
- Headquarters: Taiwan
- Website: www.dynacw.com

DynaComware Corp. (Chinese: 威鋒數位開發股份有限公司) is a type foundry company based in Taiwan, which was founded in 1987 as DynaLab Inc. (華康科技開發股份有限公司). It is a supplier of CJK fonts to businesses in Japan, Taiwan, Hong Kong, China, and the US.

DynaComware fonts can be found in Chinese software, embedded, and mobile devices. Major clients for DynaComware products include Microsoft, Apple Daily News, Panasonic, PC HOME, the Taiwanese government, and Longhua Technical University. DynaLab fonts (DF) for Chinese, Japanese and Korean were also bundled with some versions of CorelDRAW such as X5 and X6.

The company was the only supplier for Traditional Chinese fonts for Microsoft Windows from the first edition of Traditional Chinese Windows (3.1), until the release of Windows Vista, which contained Microsoft Jhenghei, which is supplied by Monotype Corporation.

== History ==
In 1988, DynaLab entered the Japanese market, shipping its first Japanese product in 1990. In 1991, the company acquired CompuFont Limited.

In 1992, DynaLab became the supplier of the default interface font for Traditional Chinese Windows 3.1.

In 1993, DynaLab started a Japanese branch, DynaLab Japan (ダイナラブ・ジャパン株式会社). In 1996, DynaLab announced the opening of a North American subsidiary in Santa Clara, California.

In 1997, DynaLab's Japanese publishing business was re-branded as AsiaSurf Technology Japan (アジアサーブテクノロジージャパン株式会社), and in 2000, AsiaSurf Technology Japan was renamed to DynaLab Japan (ダイナネットジャパン株式会社).

In 2001, DynaComware Corporation (ダイナコムウェア株式会社) was established in Japan and the font products, licensing, electronic transfer and other businesses of DynaLab Japan Limited and DynaNet Japan Limited, were transferred to DynaComware Corporation. However, the mainland China branches (including Hong Kong) still use the original Chinese company name.

== Branches ==
English name	Localized name	Location
DynaComware Hong Kong Limited	華康科技(香港)有限公司	Wan Chai, Hong Kong
DynaComware Beijing Limited	北京华康信息技术有限公司	Beijing, China
DynaComware Shanghai Limited	上海华康计算机技术有限公司	Shanghai, China
DynaComware Taiwan Inc.	威鋒數位開發股份有限公司	Taipei, Taiwan
DynaComware Corporation	ダイナコムウェア株式会社	Tokyo, Japan
DynaLab North America (old)	DynaLab North America (old)	Santa Clara, California, USA

== DynaFont ==
The company's CJK fonts have been sold under the DynaFont (華康字型) label since 1988. This name is the company's original name. Initially sold as ROM cards targeted at the desktop publishing market, it was eventually offered in PostScript format in 1991. The ROM card products did not store fonts in ROM, but stored font handling applications in ROM designed to improve transfer rate between connected devices on contemporary machines.

In addition to retail font packages, DynaFonts are also bundled in the company's other typographic products. In America, the individual fonts are sold in the company's online store.

Linotype GmbH also sold DynaFont typefaces, but only offers Open-type variants under the Open-type Std category.

== Other products ==
In addition to fonts, the company also produces font editors, font managers, font server software, and font engines. In 1993, the company also distributed the Chinese version of QuarkXPress. In 2000, the company began development of DynaDoc, a portable document technology specially developed to handle the exchange of electronic documents for ideographic languages. Later DynaDoc products also incorporate DigiType technology. In 2004, the company developed DigiType, a stroke-based font format.

== See also ==
- List of companies of Taiwan
