= Sandoll Communications =

South Korean type foundry

Sandoll
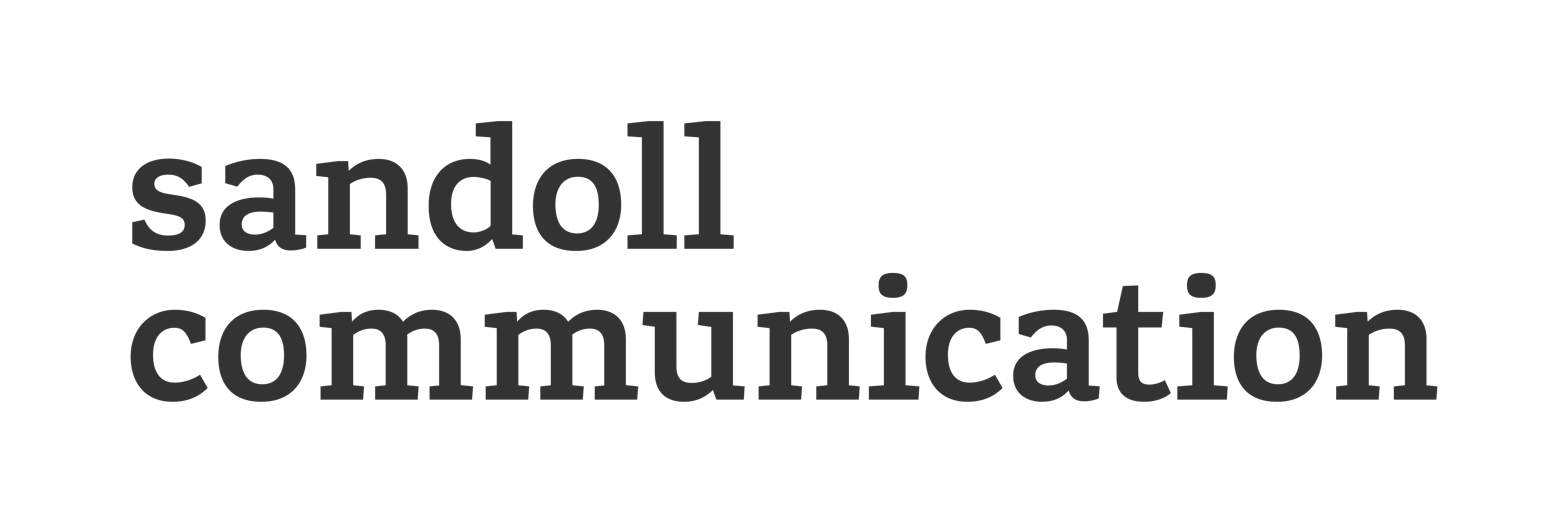
- Native name: 산돌
- Founded: 1984
- Headquarters: Jongno District
- Website: en.sandoll.co.kr

Sandoll Inc. (Korean: 산돌; RR: Sandol, pronounced [sɐndoɭ]), is a South Korean type foundry. It is mainly known for designing the typefaces Malgun Gothic for Microsoft, Nanum for Naver, and Apple SD Gothic Neo for Apple. The company was founded in 1984.
