= Microsoft YaHei =

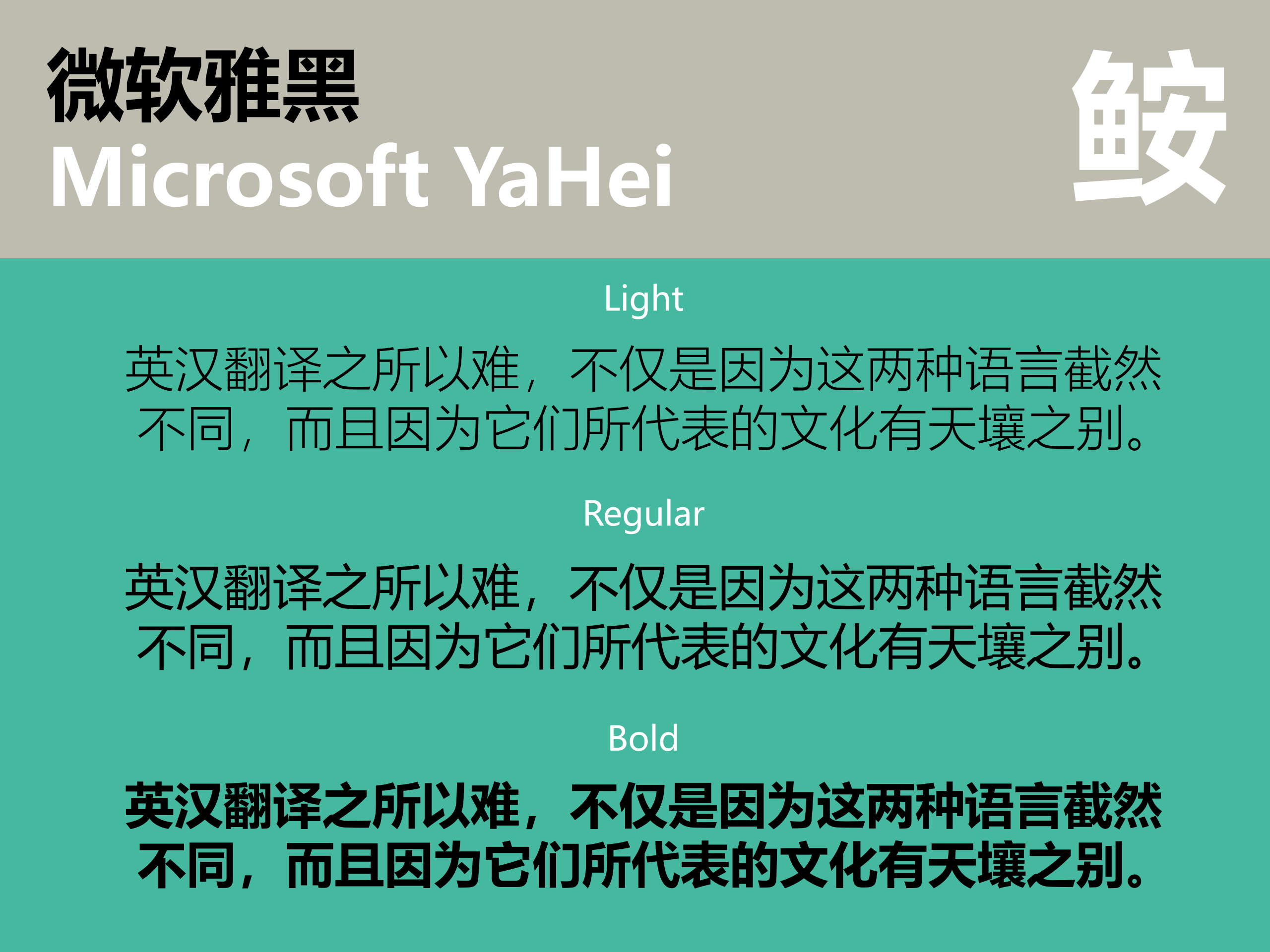
- Category: Sans-serif
- Classification: East Asian gothic typeface
- Designer: Qi Li (chief designer for ideograms)
- Commissioned by: Microsoft
- Foundry: Founder Electronics, Monotype Imaging (hinting)
- Date created: 1997-07-18
- Trademark: Microsoft

Microsoft YaHei (Chinese: 微软雅黑; pinyin: Wēiruǎn Yǎhēi) is a sans-serif gothic typeface created by Founder Electronics and Monotype Corporation under commission from Microsoft. Hinting for the font was undertaken by Monotype Imaging. The CJK ideographic characters were designed by the Founder Electronics foundry's senior designer, Li Qi (齐立).

== Development ==
Development began in 2004 when Microsoft commissioned Beijing Founder Electronics Co., Ltd. for a ClearType font for use in the simplified Chinese version of Windows Vista as default font.

The ideographs in YaHei were based on a previous sans-serif font family the same designer had made in the early 1990s which, like YaHei, did not feature flared stroke terminals. Changes to the prototype fonts include redesigning the hook stroke with a longer end, the addition of 'foot' ending stroke terminal, readjusting the black and white proportions of glyphs, the introduction of dents in stroke path outlines that intersect other stroke path outlines, and flattening the diagonal dot stroke top at the top of the glyph. YaHei is optimized for screen use.

== Microsoft YaHei ==
The font family originally includes two fonts in regular and bold weights: named MSYH.TTF and 'Microsoft YaHei Bold' in a separate file, MSYHBD.TTF. OpenType features include vertical writing.

Microsoft YaHei has been distributed with Windows since Windows Vista, and is the default user interface font when the language is set to Simplified Chinese. It aims to be more legible than its SimSun predecessor when used with ClearType. It is also included in the Simplified Chinese version of Microsoft Office 2007.

Downloading and installing the Simplified Chinese ClearType fonts for Windows XP from Microsoft also made Microsoft YaHei available on Windows XP.

The font file contains all 20,902 original CJK Unified Ideographs code points specified in Unicode, plus approximately 80 code points defined by the Standardization Administration of China. It supports the GBK character set, with localized glyphs.

Semilight, Semibold and Heavy weight fonts were introduced with Windows 10 Spring Creators Update.

== Microsoft YaHei UI ==
Microsoft YaHei UI, a version of Microsoft YaHei with alternate character design and reduced line height, was introduced with Windows 8. As part of Microsoft YaHei update, Microsoft YaHei UI is included in a TTC file along with Microsoft YaHei.

== Founder Electronics versions ==
Founder Electronics versions of the fonts are released in various character sets depending on family: GB2312-80 (with simplified Chinese characters), GB12345-90 (with traditional Chinese characters), GBK (with simplified and traditional Chinese characters), BIG-5 (for Hong Kong and Taiwan region), GB18030-2000 (includes GBK and all Big-5 characters mapped to Unicode CJK Unified Ideographs and Extension A).

=== FZLanTingHei ===
FZLanTingHei (方正兰亭黑) is a Founder Electronics variant based on the Microsoft YaHei, but the Latin glyphs were changed to resemble Arial. FZLanTingHei-DB and FZLanTingHei-B correspond to the font weights of YaHei and YaHei Bold respectively.

The family includes 14 font styles in 10 weights and 3 widths, with condensed and extended widths for H width R weights. Released character set fonts include GB2312-80, GB12345-90, GBK, BIG-5, GB18030-2000.

=== FZLanTingKanHei ===
FZLanTingHei (方正兰亭刊黑) is based on FZLanTingHei, but designed for printing.

The family includes 1 font styles in 1 weight and 1 width, with font weight equal to EL and middle width from FZLanTingHei. Released character set fonts include GB2312-80, GB12345-90, GBK.

=== FZLanTingYuan ===
FZLanTingYuan (方正兰亭圆) is based on FZLanTingHei, with rounded terminals and corners and elimination of 'foot' stroke terminals. Latin glyphs were changed for lowercase a, g to be less like Arial. Designers included Cui Yan, Han Chunli, Zhang Zhang, Shao Wei, Yan Yao, Li Xueying, Wang Ji (Jie?), Zhao Yue, He Yuan.

The family includes 9 font styles in 9 weights (H, EB, B, DB1, DB, M, R, L, EL) and 1 width (medium). Released character set fonts include GB2312-80, GB12345-90, GBK.

=== Awards ===
FZLanTingHei won bronze prize for the 2009 DFA Design for Asia Award.

== See also ==
- List of CJK fonts
- Malgun Gothic
- Meiryo
- Microsoft JhengHei
