= Kochi (font) =

Series of Japanese typeface

Kochi (東風フォント) was a font development project to build free replacements of proprietary fonts such as MS Gothic or MS Mincho, developed by Yasuyuki Furukawa (古川 泰之). The project consisted of the Kochi Gothic and Kochi Mincho fonts. It was released in the public domain.

== Plagiarism controversy ==
The Kochi Mincho font began as an outline version of a raster font known as Watanabe (渡邊). This version was deprecated in 2003 after it was discovered by Hiroki Kanou, one of the developers, that Watanabe was largely copied from a commercial font, TypeBank Mincho-M; while it was not clear that any law was being broken, the developers were not interested in working with plagiarised material.

While Hitachi, who claimed to own the TypeBank font, had announced that they were willing to permit its restricted use in Linux systems, the direction preferred was to discontinue the old Kochi fonts and replace them with new versions that did not contain any of the plagiarised characters. The new font family was called Kochi-substitute: it retained the old Kochi Gothic and Kochi Mincho font names, but the file names were changed to kochi-gothic-subst.ttf and kochi-mincho-subst.ttf, respectively.

Kochi-Substitute is currently a part of the efont project, maintained by Hiroki Kanou.

== Kochi-Substitute character sources ==
The outlines of kana and Latin glyphs in Kochi Gothic come from the old Kochi font project for kana and Latin-based characters. Greek and Cyrillic glyphs were built specifically for Kochi-Substitute by Uchida (内田).

For other characters, Kochi Mincho uses the Wadalab Mincho (和田研明朝) outline.

Kochi Gothic uses Wadalab Gothic for JIS X 0208 characters and Wadalab Maru for JIS X 0212 characters.

Kochi Gothic uses embedded bitmaps from following:

- Naga 10 for 10-pixel font, Shinonome12 for 12-pixel font, k14goth for 14-pixel font, Shinonome 16 for 16-pixel font, Ayu 20dot Font (東風) for 20-pixel font.

Kochi Mincho uses embedded bitmaps from following:

- Naga 10 for 10-pixel font, Shinonome12 for 12-pixel font, Tachibana font (橘フォント, k14) for 14-pixel font, Shinonome 16 for 16-pixel font, Kappa 20dot Font for 20-pixel font.

Each font contains 15365 glyphs (14755 characters). Many characters (including most Latin-1 Supplement characters) are, however, not visible.

Both fonts also support following code pages: 1252 (Latin 1), 1250 (Latin 2), 1251 (Cyrillic), 1254 (Turkish), 1257 (Windows Baltic), 932 (JIS/Japan), Reserved for OEM, 865 (MS-DOS Nordic), 863 (MS-DOS Canadian French), 861 (MS-DOS Icelandic), 857 (MS-DOS IBM Turkish), 852 (Latin 2), 775 (MS-DOS Baltic), 850 (WE/Latin 1), 437 (US).

OpenType layout tables support Vertical Writing for kana under default and Japanese languages.

== See also ==
- List of CJK fonts
