= Avestan (Unicode block) =

- Range: U+10B00..U+10B3F (64 code points)
- Plane: SMP
- Scripts: Avestan
- Major alphabets: Pazand
- Assigned: 61 code points
- Unused: 3 reserved code points

Unicode version history
- 5.2 (2009): 61 (+61)

Unicode documentation
- Code chart ∣ Web page

Avestan is a Unicode block containing characters devised for recording the Zoroastrian religious texts, Avesta, and was used to write the Middle Persian, or Pazand language.

Avestan^{[1]}^{[2]} Official Unicode Consortium code chart (PDF)
	0	1	2	3	4	5	6	7	8	9	A	B	C	D	E	F
U+10B0x	𐬀	𐬁	𐬂	𐬃	𐬄	𐬅	𐬆	𐬇	𐬈	𐬉	𐬊	𐬋	𐬌	𐬍	𐬎	𐬏
U+10B1x	𐬐	𐬑	𐬒	𐬓	𐬔	𐬕	𐬖	𐬗	𐬘	𐬙	𐬚	𐬛	𐬜	𐬝	𐬞	𐬟
U+10B2x	𐬠	𐬡	𐬢	𐬣	𐬤	𐬥	𐬦	𐬧	𐬨	𐬩	𐬪	𐬫	𐬬	𐬭	𐬮	𐬯
U+10B3x	𐬰	𐬱	𐬲	𐬳	𐬴	𐬵				𐬹	𐬺	𐬻	𐬼	𐬽	𐬾	𐬿
Notes: 1. As of Unicode version 16.0; 2. Grey areas indicate non-assigned code points

== History ==
The following Unicode-related documents record the purpose and process of defining specific characters in the Avestan block:

Version	Final code points (Note: Proposed code points and characters names may differ from final code points and names)	Count	L2 ID	WG2 ID	Document
5.2	U+10B00..10B35, 10B39..10B3F	61	L2/98-031	N1684	Everson, Michael (1998-01-18), Proposal to encode Avestan in the BMP of ISO/IEC 10646
5.2	U+10B00..10B35, 10B39..10B3F	61	L2/98-070		Aliprand, Joan; Winkler, Arnold, "3.A.3. item a. Avestan", Minutes of the joint UTC and L2 meeting from the meeting in Cupertino, February 25-27, 1998
5.2	U+10B00..10B35, 10B39..10B3F	61	L2/98-286	N1703	Umamaheswaran, V. S.; Ksar, Mike (1998-07-02), "8.9.4", Unconfirmed Meeting Minutes, WG 2 Meeting #34, Redmond, WA, USA; 1998-03-16--20
5.2	U+10B00..10B35, 10B39..10B3F	61	L2/00-128		Bunz, Carl-Martin (2000-03-01), Scripts from the Past in Future Versions of Unicode
5.2	U+10B00..10B35, 10B39..10B3F	61	L2/01-007		Bunz, Carl-Martin (2000-12-21), "Avestan", Iranianist Meeting Report: Symposium on Encoding Iranian Scripts in Unicode
5.2	U+10B00..10B35, 10B39..10B3F	61	L2/02-009		Bunz, Carl-Martin (2001-11-23), "Avestan and Pahlavi scripts", 2nd Iranian Meeting Report
5.2	U+10B00..10B35, 10B39..10B3F	61	L2/02-450		Gippert, Jost (2002-11-29), 3rd Iranian Unicode Conference: Conference material (29-11-2002)
5.2	U+10B00..10B35, 10B39..10B3F	61	L2/02-449	N2556	Everson, Michael (2002-12-04), Revised proposal to encode the Avestan and Pahlavi script in the UCS
5.2	U+10B00..10B35, 10B39..10B3F	61	L2/06-335	N3178	Everson, Michael; Pournader, Roozbeh (2006-10-20), Proposal to encode the Avestan script in the BMP of the UCS
5.2	U+10B00..10B35, 10B39..10B3F	61	L2/06-375		Gippert, Jost (2006-11-06), Note from Jost Gippert to Deborah Anderson in support of Avestan
5.2	U+10B00..10B35, 10B39..10B3F	61	L2/07-004	N3193	Everson, Michael; Baker, Peter; Dohnicht, Marcus; Emiliano, António; Haugen, Odd Einar; Pedro, Susana; Perry, David J.; Pournader, Roozbeh (2007-01-09), Proposal to add Medievalist and Iranianist punctuation characters to the UCS
5.2	U+10B00..10B35, 10B39..10B3F	61	L2/07-015		Moore, Lisa (2007-02-08), "Consensus 110-C30", UTC #110 Minutes
5.2	U+10B00..10B35, 10B39..10B3F	61	L2/07-006R	N3197R	Everson, Michael; Pournader, Roozbeh (2007-03-22), Revised proposal to encode the Avestan script in the SMP of the UCS
5.2	U+10B00..10B35, 10B39..10B3F	61	L2/07-268	N3253 (pdf, doc)	Umamaheswaran, V. S. (2007-07-26), "M50.35", Unconfirmed minutes of WG 2 meeting 50, Frankfurt-am-Main, Germany; 2007-04-24/27
5.2	U+10B00..10B35, 10B39..10B3F	61	L2/07-304	N3336	Anderson, Deborah (2007-09-13), Comments on the Avestan Separation Point
5.2	U+10B00..10B35, 10B39..10B3F	61	L2/08-088	N3443	Anderson, Deborah (2008-01-28), Additional Comments on the Avestan Separation Point
5.2	U+10B00..10B35, 10B39..10B3F	61	L2/08-173	N3444	Anderson, Deborah (2008-04-13), Expert Feedback on AVESTAN SEPARATION POINT
5.2	U+10B00..10B35, 10B39..10B3F	61	L2/08-155		Anderson, Deborah (2008-04-14), Expert Feedback on Avestan Separation Point by Profs. Skjaervo, Jamison, and Watkins
