= Medieval Nordic Text Archive =

Medieval Nordic Text Archive (Menota) is a network of leading Nordic archives, libraries and research departments working with medieval texts and manuscript facsimiles. The aim of Menota is to preserve and publish medieval texts in digital form and to adapt and develop encoding standards necessary for this work.

Menota was established in 2001 and at the time of writing (June 2015) it offers 20 texts with a total of approx. 1 million words. The texts are mostly rendered on the diplomatic level (i.e. following the manuscripts in most matters of orthography), while some also are rendered on a very close level, the facsimile level (rendering abbreviations as such and some allographic variation), and others also on a normalised level, in which the orthography corresponds to the one found in grammars and dictionaries and text series like Íslenzk fornrit.

In addition to the archive of texts, Menota also offers a handbook in XML text encoding, The Menota handbook. This is based on the Guidelines of the Text Encoding Initiative, and discusses a number of encoding questions relating to vernacular manuscripts. The handbook is published digitally on the Menota site, and it offers a full TEI-style Document Type Definition and a Relax NG schema for anyone who wants to encode Medieval Nordic manuscripts.

Menota welcomes transcriptions of all kinds of Medieval Nordic primary sources, i.e. directly from the manuscript itself or a good facsimile of it, as long as the transcription has been proofread to an acceptable level and it is delivered in a valid XML file according to the schema available on the Menota site.

Menota follows the recommendations of the Medieval Unicode Font Initiative with respect to the encoding and display of special characters. On the normalised level of text rendering, all necessary characters will be found in the official part of the Unicode Standard, but some characters on a diplomatic level and several on a facsimile level can only be displayed by using characters in the Private Use Area of Unicode. MUFI offers several free or low-cost fonts for this use.

== Website ==
- Medieval Nordic Text Archive.

== See also ==
- Menotec
- Medieval Unicode Font Initiative
