= Konungs skuggsjá =

Norwegian educational text in Old Norse

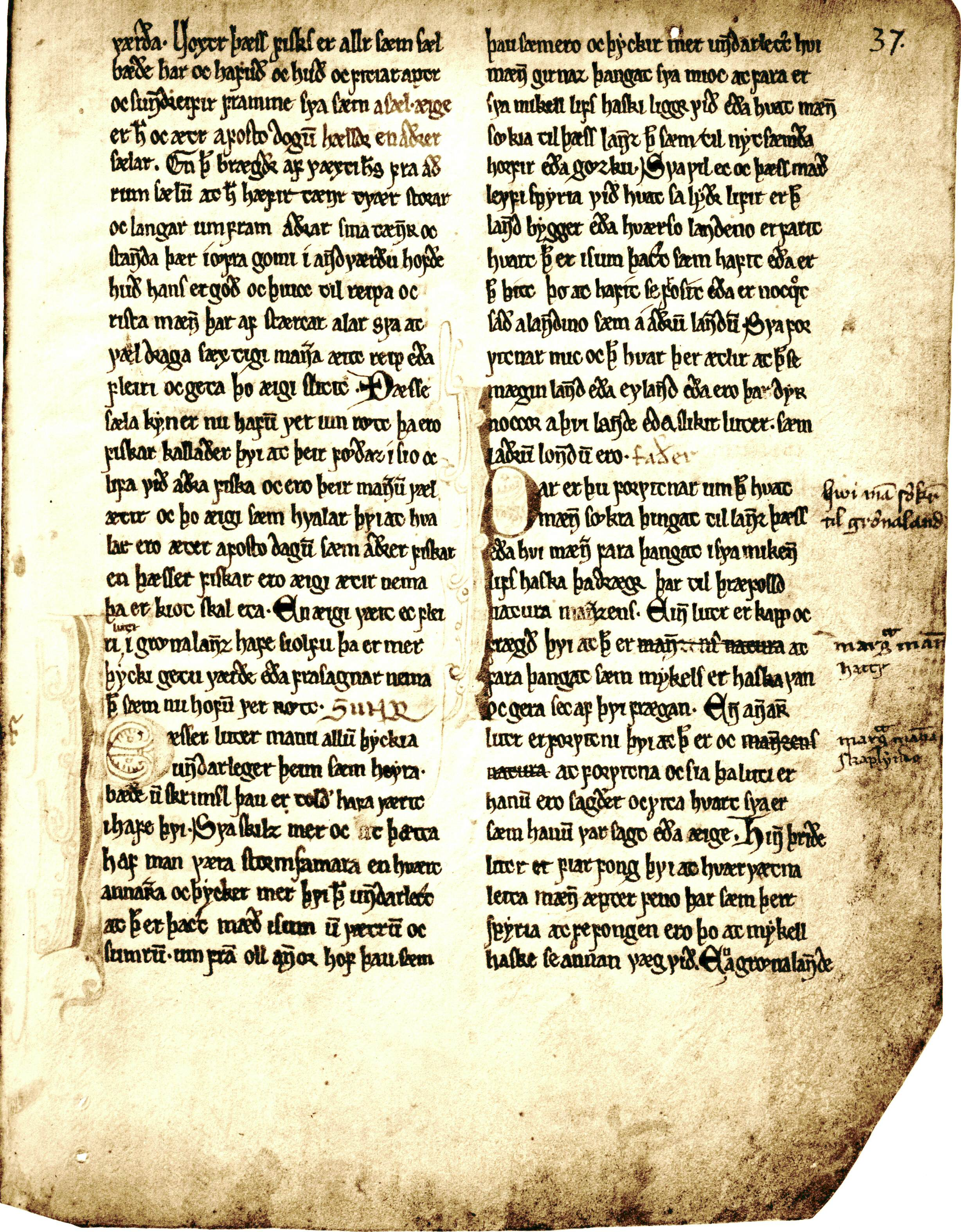
A page from Konungs skuggsjá

Konungs skuggsjá (Old Norse for "King's mirror"; Latin: Speculum regale, modern Norwegian: Kongsspegelen (Nynorsk) or Kongespeilet (Bokmål)) is a Norwegian didactic text in Old Norse from around 1250, an example of speculum literature that deals with politics and morality. It was originally intended for the education of King Magnus Lagabøte, the son of King Håkon Håkonsson, and it has the form of a dialogue between father and son. The son asks and is advised by his father about practical and moral matters, concerning trade, the hird, chivalric behavior, strategy and tactics. Parts of Konungs skuggsjá deal with the relationship between church and state.

A study of the relations of the text's manuscripts was undertaken by Ludvig Holm-Olsen, underpinning his 1983 edition. The most important manuscript is AM 243 a fol., copied in Norway (probably Bergen), around 1275.

== Form and contents ==
The seventy chapters of the text consist of a prologue and two main parts, of which the second may perhaps be subdivided into two sections, one focused on the king's court, the other (more specifically) on the king's justice. In the prologue, the speaker sets out to deal with merchants, kingsmen, the clergy and peasants, but his discussion does not extend much beyond the first two classes. It seems possible that the last two chapters were originally intended for a separate treatment of the clergy.

Prologue
1. The son states the purpose of the work, useful as he considers it to be both as a King's Mirror and as a handbook for a wider audience.

First part. The merchant and the natural world
2. The dialogue between father (himself a kingsman) and son begins.
3–4. The business and customs of the merchant
5. The sun and the winds
6–7. The sun's course
8. The marvels of Norway
9. Scepticism about the genuineness of marvels
10–1. Marvels of Ireland
12–5. Marvels of the Icelandic sea (e.g. whales) and of Iceland (e.g. volcanoes, springs)
16–20. Marvels of Greenland, its waters, animals, products, climate, etc.
21. Cold and hot zones of the earth
22–3. Navigation, winds and seasons

Second part. (1) The king and his court 24. The king and his court
25. The importance of courtesy () in the royal service
26. Advantages from serving in the king's household
27. Classes among the kingsmen (konungsmenn): hirdmenn, gestir, general officials and officials who serve the king abroad
28. Honoured position of kingsmen
29. The hirð, top layer of kingsmen
30. How to approach the king for a post in the hirð
31. Why not to wear a mantle in the king's presence
32–4. Rules of speech and conversation in the king's hall
35–6. Relation between the quality of crops and the moral standard of government
37. Duties, activities and entertainments of royal guardsmen
38. Weapons of offence and defence
39. Military engines
40–1. Proper manners and customs at the royal court

(2) Truth and justice
42. God's justice
43–4. Responsibilities and position of the king
45. The importance of leniency in the king's judgment
46–9. The importance of severity in the king's judgment, and the Fall of Lucifer
50–3. Further discussion of the relation between justice, peace and mercy.
54. The king's prayer
55. The king's judicial business (again)
56. Speech of wisdom
57–8. The king's judicial business (again)
59–60. Mercy and severity of judgment
61–2. capital punishment
63. God's judgment in the story of David and Saul
64–6. Judgments of Solomon (e.g. with reference Shimei and Adonijah)
67. Solomon's broken promise to Joab
68. When to keep or break promises
69. Kingship, church and God
70. The authority of kings and bishops

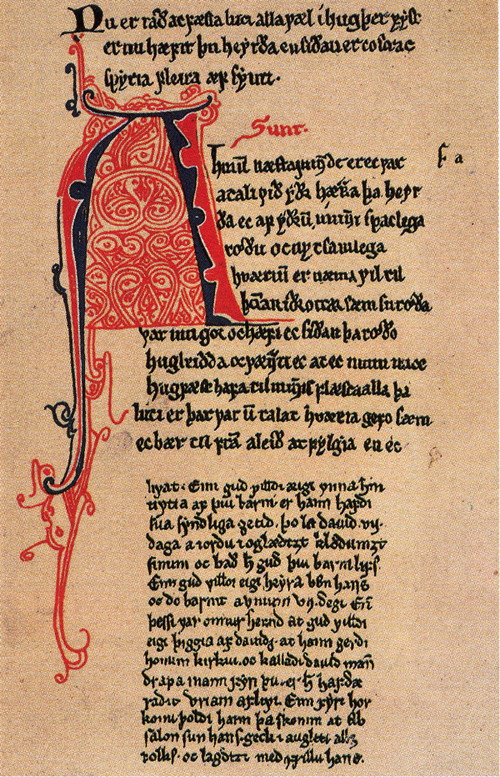
Another page

=== Advice ===
The book gives advice on various subjects, such as seafaring and trading:

A merchant must often put his own life at stake. At times on the ocean, at times in heathen countries, and almost each time among alien nations. Therefore, the merchant must always behave in a good manner in the places where he happens to find himself.

=== Marvels ===
There are several chapters on marvels in various countries. One example is an account of an encounter which fits the description of a wild man or Woodwose:

It once happened in that country (and this seems indeed strange) that a living creature was caught in the forest as to which no one could say definitely whether it was a man or some other animal; for no one could get a word from it or be sure that it understood human speech. It had the human shape, however, in every detail, both as to hands and face and feet; but the entire body was covered with hair as the beasts are, and down the back it had a long coarse mane like that of a horse, which fell to both sides and trailed along the ground when the creature stooped in walking.

Another story tells that after mass in a church in Ireland, the people found an anchor hanging from a rope from the sky. The anchor got stuck on the church doorway. Looking up, they saw a ship with men, and one came down, as though swimming in the air, to free the anchor. The people tried to grab him, but the bishop forbade them, and the man went back up. The men in the ship cut the rope, and the anchor was kept in the town.

== Legacy ==
A quote from the Konungs skuggsjá is seen on the gravestone of pioneering Danish linguist Rasmus Rask. It reads: Ef þú vilt fullkominn vera í fróðleik þá nem þú allar tungur, en týn þó eigi at heldr þinni tungu. "If you wish to become perfect in knowledge, you must learn all the languages, and yet, do not neglect your native tongue or speech."

== Editions, facsimiles and translations ==
In chronological order:

- Hálfdan Einarsson (ed. and trans.), Konungs skuggsjá (Sórey 1768). Editio princeps, with Latin and Danish translations.
- Keyser, Rudolf et al. Speculum regale. Konungs-skuggsjá. Konge-speilet. Christiania, 1848. At the Internet Archive.
- Brenner, Oscar (ed.). Speculum Regale: ein Altnorwegischer Dialog. Munich, 1881. PDF available from septentrionalia.net
- The Arnamagæan Manuscript 243 ß, folio: The Main Manuscript of Konungs Skuggsjá in Phototypic Reproduction with Diplomatic Text, ed. by George Flom (Urbana: University of Illinois Press, 1915)
- Larson, Laurence Marcellus (tr.). The King’s Mirror (Speculum regale-Konungs skuggsjá). Scandinavian Monographs 3. New York: The American-Scandinavian Foundation, 1917. PDF available from Internet Archive; transcript; Scan
- Finnur Jónsson (ed.). Konungs Skuggsjá: Speculum Regale. Det Kongelige Nordiske Oldskriftselskab. Copenhagen, 1920.
- Jónsson, Finnur (tr.). Kongspejlet: Konungs skuggsjá. Det Kongelige Nordiske Oldskriftselskab. Copenhagen, 1926. Online edition
- Meissner, Rudolf (ed. and tr.). Der Königsspiegel. Konungsskuggsjá. Halle/Saale, 1944.
- Magnús Már Lárusson (ed.), Konungs skuggsjá = Speculum regale (Reykjavík: Leiftur, 1955). Modern Icelandic spelling.
- Meissner, Rudolf (tr.). Der Königsspiegel. Fahrten und Leben der alten Norweger aufgezeichnet im 13. Jahrhundert. Leipzig und Weimar: Gustav Kiepenheuer, 1978.
- Holm-Olsen, Ludvig (ed.). Konungs Skuggsjá. 2nd ed. Oslo: Norsk Historisk Kjeldeskrift-institutt, 1983.
- Holm-Olsen, Ludvig (ed.). The King's Mirror: AM 243 a fol. Early Icelandic Manuscripts in Facsimile, XVII. Copenhagen: Rosenkilde and Bagger, 1987. Facsimile
- Einar Már Jónsson (tr.). Le miroir royal. Lausanne: Éd. Esprit ouvert, 1997.
- Online facsimile of AM 243 i 4to

== Secondary literature ==
- Bagge, Sverre. The Political Thought of the King's Mirror. Odense, 1987.
- Bagge, Sverre. "Forholdet mellom Kongespeilet og Stjórn." Arkiv för Nordisk Filologi 89 (1974): 163–202.
- Grabes, Herbert. Speculum, Mirror and Looking-Glass. Tübingen, 1973.
- Holm-Olsen, Ludvig. "The Prologue to The King's Mirror. Did the author of the work write it?" In Speculum Norrœnum. Norse studies in memory of Gabriel Turville-Petre, ed. Ursula Dronke, et al. Odense, 1981. 223–41.
- Holm-Olsen, Ludvig (ed.). Handskriftene av Konungs Skuggsja. Bibliotheca Arnamagnaeana 13. Munksgaard, 1952.
- Schnall, Jens Eike and Rudolf Simek (eds.). Speculum regale. Der altnorwegische Königsspiegel (Konungs skuggsjá) in der europäischen Tradition. Studia Medievalia Septentrionalia 5. Vienna: Fassbinder, 2000. Göttingen: Vandenhoeck & Ruprecht, 2000.
- Schnall, Jens Eike. Didaktische Absichten und Vermittlungsstrategien im altnorwegischen Königsspiegel (Konungs skuggsja). Palaestra. Untersuchungen aus der deutschen und skandinavischen Philologie 307. [Based on the author's 1997 dissertation]
- Simek, Rudolf. "The Political Thought in the King's Mirror. A Supplement." In Festschrift für Jónas Kristjánsson. Reykjavik, 1994. 723–34.
- Tveitane, Mathias (ed.). Studier over Konungs skuggsjá. Bergen, 1971. Includes a bibliography at pages 188–92.
