= CYFI =

CYFI may refer to:

- Cyrillic Font Initiative, part of the Medieval Unicode Font Initiative
- Child and Youth Finance International, a global non-profit organization based in the Netherland
- Fort MacKay/Firebag Aerodrome (ICAO code CYFI), an airport in Alberta, Canada.
