= Ludvig Holm-Olsen =

Norwegian philologist

Ludvig Holm-Olsen (9 June 1914 – 10 June 1990) was a Norwegian philologist.

He was born in Tromøy Municipality as a son of shipmaster and accident investigator Peter Olsen (1866–1950) and Louise Holm (1885–1969). He was a nephew of Magnus Olsen. Since 1941 he was married to Elsa Dorothea Triseth.

He finished his secondary education at Frogner School in 1932, studied at the University of Oslo and graduated in 1940 with the cand.philol. degree. His master's thesis Den gammelnorske oversettelse av Pamphilus was published in the same year. Holm-Olsen specialized in Old Norse philology and was a research fellow from 1945 and docent from 1949, both at the University of Oslo. He took the dr.philos. degree at the University of Copenhagen in 1952 with the thesis ''Håndskriftene av Konungs skuggsjá. En undersøkelse av deres tekstkritiske verdi, about Konungs skuggsjá. He was then a professor of Norse philology at the University of Bergen from 1953 to his retirement in 1981. There, he served as dean from 1956 to 1958 and rector from 1960 to 1965.

He co-edited the journal Maal og Minne from 1951 to 1984 and the journal Arkiv för nordisk filologi from 1963 to 1990. Important publications other than his theses include Studier i Sverres saga (1952). He also contributed to Norges litteraturhistorie and released more popular books such as Lys over norrøn kultur (1981) and Med fjærpenn og pergament (1990).

He was a member of the Norwegian Academy of Science and Letters from 1953, and was decorated as a Knight First Class of the Order of St. Olav in 1967 and a Grand Knight of the Order of the Falcon.

Academic offices
Preceded by Erik Waaler	Rector of the University of Bergen; 1960–1965	Succeeded by Håkon Mosby
