= Selections from the Writings of Kierkegaard =

- Book title to Selections from the Writings of Kierkegaard
- Author: Lee M. Hollander
- Language: English
- Subject: Philosophy
- Publisher: University of Texas Austin
- Publication date: 1923
- Publication place: United States
- English publication date: 1923
- Media type: Print (Hardback)

Selections from the Writings of Kierkegaard is a 1923 book about Søren Kierkegaard by the American scholar Lee M. Hollander. Its publication marked a significant turning-point in American and English language philosophy, as it introduced English translation excerpts of Kierkegaard's philosophy to America and other English-speaking countries.
