= Maal og Minne =

- Discipline: Linguistics
- Language: Danish, English, German, Norwegian, Swedish
- Edited by: Lars S. Vikør, Jon Gunnar Jørgensen

Publication details
- History: 1909-present
- Publisher: Novus forlag (Norway)
- Frequency: Biannual

Standard abbreviations
- ISO 4: Maal Minne

Indexing
- CODEN: MAMIFJ
- ISSN: 0024-855X
- LCCN: ca13000842
- OCLC no.: 186357362

Links
- Journal homepage

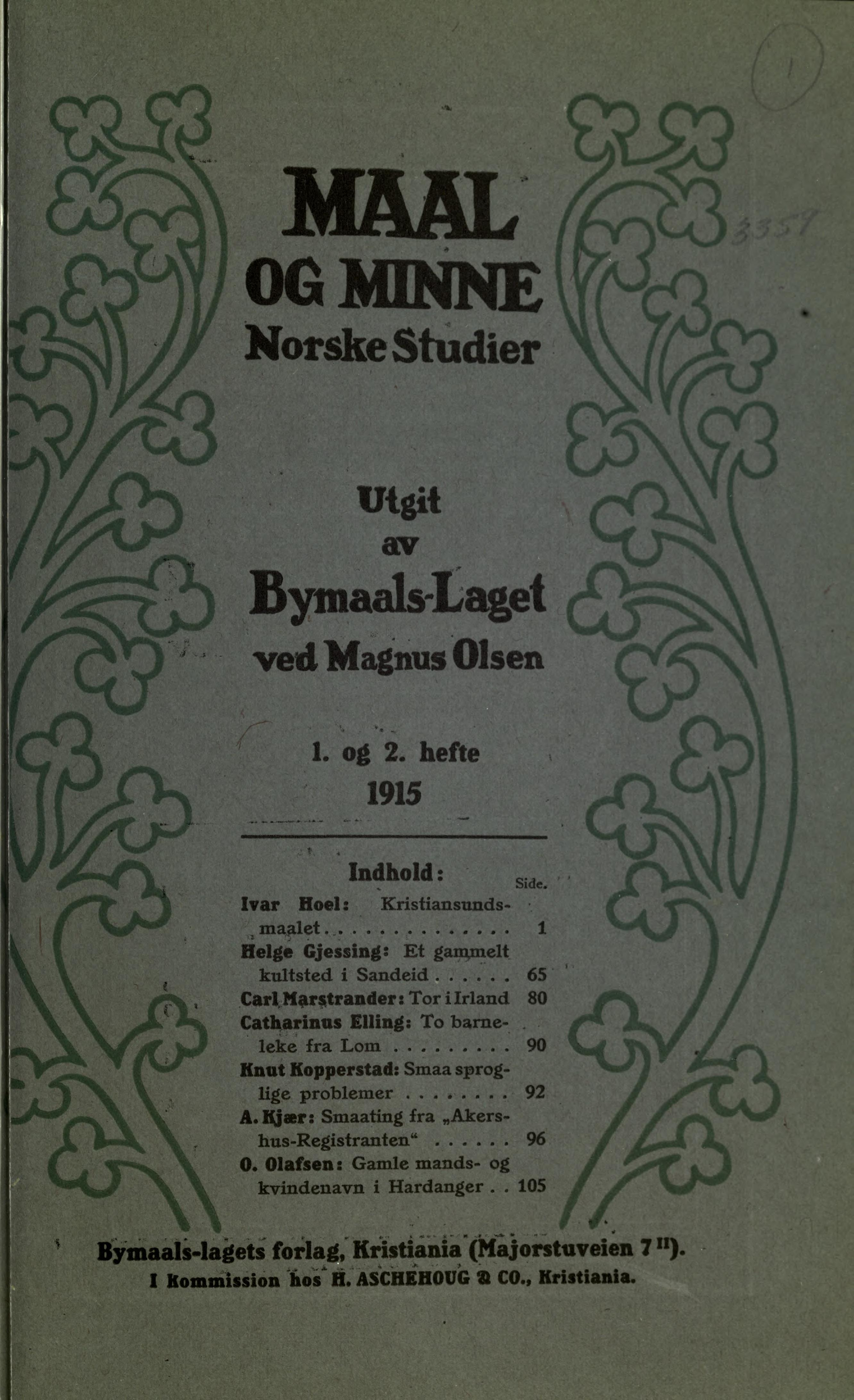
A picture of a journal by Maal og Minne

Maal og Minne ("Language and Memory") is a Norwegian academic journal of linguistics established in 1909 by Magnus Olsen. It covers research on Scandinavian languages, focusing mainly on language history and philology. It is a "level 2" journal in the Norwegian Scientific Index. The current editors-in-chief are Lars S. Vikør and Jon Gunnar Jørgensen.

== Editors ==
The following persons are or have been editors of the journal:

- 1909–1950 Magnus Olsen
- 1951–1967 Trygve Knudsen and Ludvig Holm-Olsen
- 1968–1984 Ludvig Holm-Olsen and Einar Lundeby
- 1985–1993 Einar Lundeby and Bjarne Fidjestøl
- 1994 Einar Lundeby
- 1995 Einar Lundeby and Odd Einar Haugen
- 1996–2005 Kjell Ivar Vannebo and Odd Einar Haugen
- 2006–present Lars S. Vikør and Jon Gunnar Jørgensen
