= Laurence M. Larson =

Norwegian historian

Laurence Marcellus Larson (September 23, 1868 – March 9, 1938) was a Norwegian born, American educator, historian, writer and translator. His notable works included his translation from Old Norse of Konungs skuggsjá (Harvard UP, 1917).

== Biography ==
Laurence Larson was born at Bergen in Hordaland, Norway. He was the son of Christian Spjutoy Larson (1840–1919) and Ellen Mathilde (Bruland) Larson (1839–1916). He emigrated to the United States with his family in May 1870. He studied at Drake University and the University of Wisconsin–Madison. Larson was appointed to the UW faculty as a Scandinavian languages and history professor on April 17, 1906, but resigned later that year, on June 27. He joined the University of Illinois at Urbana-Champaign in 1907 and was appointed chair of the history department in 1923, joining another renowned scholar of Scandinavanian studies at Illinois, George T. Flom. Larson continued teaching at UIUC until his September 1937 retirement.

Larson was named a trustee of the Illinois State Historical Library in 1923. He was elected to the presidency of the American Historical Association in 1938, but died of acute bronchitis in Urbana, Illinois, aged 69, before completing his term.

== Selected works ==
- The Federal Compact of 1787. Madison: Bulletin of the University of Wisconsin (1900)
- The King's Household in England Before the Norman Conquest. Madison: Bulletin of the University of Wisconsin (1904)
- A Financial and Administrative History of Milwaukee. Madison: Bulletin of the University of Wisconsin (1908)
- "The Political Policies of Cnut as King of England." The American Historical Review, Vol. 15, No. 4 (July, 1910): 720-743. ISSN 0002-8762 <https://doi.org/10.2307/1836956>
- Canute the Great the Rise of Danish Imperialism during the Viking Age. Albany, New York: Knickerbocker Press (1912)
- "The Voyages To Vinland the Good." Publications of the Society for the Advancement of Scandinavian Study, Vol. 2, No. 2 (March, 1915): 113-117. ISSN 0036-5637 <https://www.jstor.org/stable/40914945>
- A Short History of England and the British Empire. New York: Henry Holt (1915)
- The King’s Mirror. New York: The American-Scandinavian Foundation (1917)
- The Responsibility for the Great War. Urbana: University of Illinois Press (1918)
- "The Church in North America (Greenland) in the Middle Ages." The Catholic Historical Review, Vol. 5, No. 2/3 (July - Oct., 1919): 175-194. ISSN 0008-8080 <https://www.jstor.org/stable/25011635>
- "The Kensington Rune Stone". The Wisconsin Magazine of History, Vol. 4, No. 4 (June, 1921): 382-387. ISSN 1943-7366 <https://www.jstor.org/stable/4630322>
- "Did John Scolvus Visit Labrador and New-Foundland in or about 1476?" Scandinavian Studies and Notes, Vol. 7, No. 3 (May, 1922): 81-89. <https://www.jstor.org/stable/40915104>
- The Earliest Norwegian Laws: Being the Gulathing Law and the Frostathing Law. New York: Columbia University Press (1935)
- The Changing West: And Other Essays. Northfield, Minn.: Norwegian-American Historical Association (1937)
- The Log Book of a Young Immigrant. Northfield, Minn.: Norwegian American Historical Association (1939)
  - review by Martin B. Ruud: "Review of The Log Book of a Young Immigrant" by Laurence M. Larson. Minnesota History, Vol. 21, No. 1 (March, 1940): 64-68. <https://www.jstor.org/stable/20162375>

== Other sources ==
- Larson, Laurence Marcellus (1939) The Log Book of a Young Immigrant (Norwegian-American Historical Association)
- Laurence M. Larson Papers, 1876–1938 | University of Illinois Archives
