= Einar Johannes Lundeby =

Norwegian linguist

Einar Johannes Lundeby (3 October 1914 – 7 March 2011) was a Norwegian linguist.

He was born in Spydeberg. He was hired as a lecturer in Norwegian language at the University of Oslo in 1961. He took the dr.philos. degree in 1966 and was promoted to docent in the North Germanic languages in 1967, before serving as professor from 1971 to 1984. Notable academic publications include Overbestemt substantiv i norsk og de andre nordiske språk (1965) and Om utbrytningens opphav og innhold (1976); textbooks include Språket vårt gjennom tidene (1956 with Ingvald Torvik). He also co-edited Maal og Minne from 1967 to 1995.

He was a member of the Norwegian Academy of Science and Letters. He was also a member of the Norwegian Language Council from 1980 to 1988 and chaired the International Summer School from 1981 to 1985. He died in March 2011 in Asker.

Academic offices
Preceded by	Dean of the Historical-Philosophical Faculty, University of Oslo; 1976–1978	Succeeded by
