= George T. Flom =

American linguist (1871–1960)

George Tobias Flom
- Born: April 12, 1871; Utica, Wisconsin
- Died: January 4, 1960 (aged 88); Urbana, Illinois
- Education: University of Wisconsin-Madison (B.A., 1893); Vanderbilt University (M.A., 1894); Columbia University (Ph.D., 1900)
- Known for: A History of Norwegian Immigration to the United States (1909)

George Tobias Flom (April 12, 1871 – January 4, 1960) was an American professor of linguistics at the University of Illinois at Urbana Champaign and author of numerous reference books.

== Background ==
He married Loretta Regina Muldoon (1876–1952) in 1899 and together they were parents of three children: George Reginald Flom, Elizabeth Edda Flom and Mary Antionette Flom, all of whom were born in Iowa City.

== Career ==
Along with historian and Old Norse translator Laurence M. Larson, Flom established the Scandinavian studies program at Illinois, and his influence was extensive. He supervised the doctoral dissertations of, among others, Ingebrigt Lillehei, future University of Washington Scandinavian studies department chair and August Strindberg scholar Walter Gilbert Johnson (1905-1983) as well as the noted Harvard University linguist Einar Haugen. (Johnson would later supervise the Vilhelm Moberg dissertation of University of Illinois Swedish professor Rochelle A. Wright.)

He was also one of the earliest scholars to undertake a thorough investigation of the controversial Kensington Stone of Solem, Minnesota, publishing his findings twelve years after its discovery.

A so-called festschrift in Flom's honor came out in Urbana entitled Scandinavian Studies Presented to George T. Flom by Colleagues and Friends in 1942.

== See also ==
- List of presidents of the Linguistic Society of America

== Selected bibliography ==
- Flom, George T. (1900). Scandinavian Influence on Southern Lowland Scotch - New York City: Columbia University dissertation.
- Flom, George T. (1905). "Nominal and pronominal inflections of the Sogn dialects." In: Dialect Notes (publication of the American Dialect Society).
- Flom, George T. (1906). "Chapters on Scandinavian Immigration to Iowa." In: Iowa Journal of History and Politics. <https://tile.loc.gov/storage-services/public/gdcmassbookdig/chaptersonscandi00flom/chaptersonscandi00flom.pdf>
- Flom, George T. (1907). "A History of the Scandinavian Studies in American Universities, Together with a Bibliography". In: Iowa studies in language and literature Oiwa City: The State university of Iowa.
- Flom, George T. (1909). A History of Norwegian Immigration to the United States: From the Earliest Beginning Down to the Year 1848. Iowa City, Ia: Private Print.
- Flom, George T. (1909).Frithiof's Saga by Esaias Tegnér. Introduction, Bibliography and Explanatory Notes (Chicago, 1909).
- Flom, George T. (1910). The Kensington Rune-Stone: An Address. Springfield, Illinois: Illinois State Historical Society.
- Flom, George T. (1912).Bjørnson's Synnøve Solbakken. Introduction, Notes and Vocabulary, Minneapolis.
- Flom, George T. (1915). The Phonology of the Dialect of Aurland, Norway. Urbana: University of Illinois Press.
- Flom, George T. (1923). The Language of the Konungs Skuggsjá (Speculum Regale) According to the Chief Manuscript, AM. 243 B a, fol. Urbana: University of Illinois Press.
- Flom, George T. (1926). "English Loanwords in American Norwegian as Spoken in the Koshkonong Settlement, Wisconsin," American Speech (1:10): 541–558.
- Flom, George T. (1930). Introductory Old English Grammar and Reader, Boston: D.C. Heath and Company.
- Flom, George T. (1937). Old Norwegian General Law of the Gulathing: According to Codex Gl.k.S. 1154 Folio (located in the Kongelige Bibliotek, Denmark). Urbana: University of Illinois Press.
- Flom, George T. (1944). The Morphology of the Dialect on Aurland in Sogn, Norway. Urbana: University of Illinois Press.
- Flom, George T. trans. & ed. (1944). Bjornson, Synnøve Solbakken. Lutheran Free Church Publishing Co.
