= Odd Einar Haugen =

Norwegian philologist

Odd Einar Haugen (born 1 May 1954) is professor of Old Norse Philology at the University of Bergen, Norway. He was born and grew up in Lunde, Telemark, but moved to Bergen in 1973 when he began his studies at the university. He is not related to the American linguist Einar Haugen.

Haugen took his cand.philol. (master's) degree at the University of Bergen in 1982. The subject for this thesis was two of the interpolations in the Old Norwegian Barlaams ok Josaphats saga. He defended his dr.philos. thesis at the university in Bergen in 1992, on the quantitative and qualitative textual criticism of Niðrstigningar saga, Stamtre og tekstlandskap (2 vols.).

In the period 1982–1992, he was working as a research assistant in Old Norse Philology at the University of Bergen. He was appointed professor of Old Norse Philology at the University of Bergen from 1 January 1993, and he remains in this position (as of 2021). In two periods, he has also been guest professor at the University of Zürich, and he has been visiting professor at the University of Verona.

In 2000–2001, Haugen was leader of the research group Editing medieval manuscripts at the Centre for Advanced Study in Oslo. Since 2001 he has been head of Medieval Nordic Text Archive, and in the period 2001–2015 of Medieval Unicode Font Initiative. In the period 2010–2013, he was partner in the Menotec project in which a corpus of Old Norwegian manuscripts were transcribed and annotated morphologically and syntactically. He was editor (with Kjell Ivar Vannebo) of the journal Maal og Minne 1995–2005, and he is presently editor (with Karl G. Johansson and Jon Gunnar Jørgensen) of the book series Bibliotheca Nordica (since 2009).

Haugen has published widely on subjects within Old Norse philology and linguistics, textual criticism, textual and character encoding, and he has lectured at a number of European universities. He has published grammars of Old Norse (in German and Norwegian) and has edited Handbok i norrøn filologi (1st edition 2004, 2nd edition 2013), which was translated into German as Altnordische Philologie. Norwegen und Island (1st edition 2007, 2nd extended edition 2020 under the title Handbuch der norrönen Philologie). Together with Italian colleagues he has edited an introduction to the Medieval Nordic languages which includes a selection of texts with parallel translation into Italian, Le lingue nordiche nel medioevo, vol. 1.

The catalogue of texts in the Menota project contains a number of Medieval Nordic codices and fragments of codices, many of which have received a full morphological annotation. Since 2019, Haugen has added diplomas and runic inscriptions to the Menota archive in collaboration with the CLARINO project.

Haugen is member of the Royal Norwegian Society of Sciences and Letters, the Royal Gustavus Adolphus Academy and The Royal Society of Arts and Sciences in Gothenburg, and he is Norwegian member of Comité International de Paléographie Latine.

== CV with bibliography ==
- Full CV with annotated bibliography
