= Magnús Már Lárusson =

Icelandic theologian and historian

Magnús Már Lárusson (2 September 1917 – 15 January 2006) was an Icelandic theologian and historian.

He was born in Copenhagen. After finishing school in 1937 he studied theology and graduated from the University of Iceland in 1941. Between 1942 and 1949 he was a priest and schoolteacher, but was also employed at the University of Iceland in 1947. He became a professor of theology in 1953 and professor of history in 1968. From 1969 to 1973 he served as rector.

Magnús Már sat on the Skálholt Committee, the board of the Árni Magnússon Institute, the Icelandic Bible Society from 1948 to 1964 and was vice chairman of the Icelandic Archaeological Society from 1961 to 1986. He was a guest scholar at the Lund University (where he also received an honorary degree) and the University of Turku, and was a member of the Norwegian Academy of Science and Letters from 1970.

Academic offices
Preceded by Ármann Snævarr	Rector of the University of Iceland; 1969–1973	Succeeded by Guðlaugur Þorvaldsson
