= Magnus Olsen =

Norwegian philologist (1878–1963)

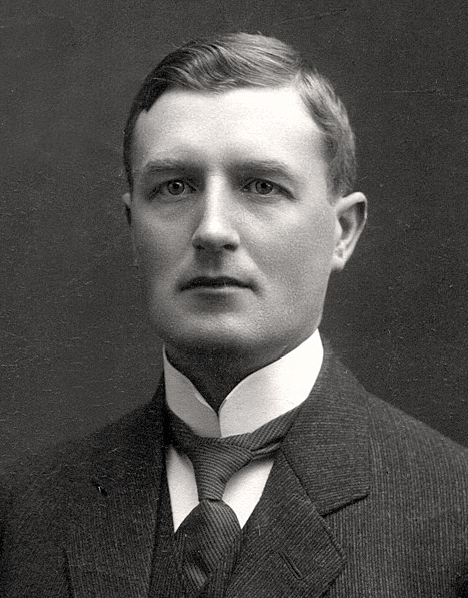
- Olsen c. 1930–1935
- Born: 28 November 1878; Arendal, Norway
- Died: 16 January 1963 (aged 84); Oslo, Norway
- Spouse: Gjertrud Mathilde Kjær (after 1912)
- Awards: Order of St. Olav; Grand Knight's Cross of the Order of the Falcon; Knight of the Order of the Polar Star

Academic background
- Education: Royal Frederick University
- Academic advisors: Sophus Bugge; Oluf Rygh

Academic work
- Discipline: Old Norse philology
- Institutions: Royal Frederick University
- Notable students: Didrik Arup Seip
- Main interests: Old Norse literature; Old Norse religion; Old Norse toponymy; Runology
- Notable works: Hedenske Kultminder i Norske Stedsnavne (1915); Ættegård og Helligdom (1926)
- Influenced: Gabriel Turville-Petre; Lee M. Hollander

Magnus Bernhard Olsen (28 November 1878 – 16 January 1963) was a Norwegian philologist who specialized in Old Norse studies. Born and raised in Arendal, Olsen received his degrees in philology at Royal Frederick University in Kristiania, where he became a protégé of Sophus Bugge. After Bugge's death, Olsen succeeded him in 1908 as Professor of Old Norwegian and Icelandic Literature at Royal Frederick University. In this capacity, he taught generations of Norwegian academics and teachers.

Olsen's field of research centered on runology and Old Norse toponymy. Olsen was particularly interested in using evidence from runes and toponymy for the study of Old Norse religion. Olsen published a number of works on these subjects, which have been highly influential. He also edited a number of works, including the journal Maal og Minne, which he founded.

During the German occupation of Norway in World War II, Olsen served as dean at his university and was involved with the Norwegian resistance movement. In his later years, Olsen's research centered on the Eddas and Skaldic poetry, on which he authored a number of influential works. He is widely considered the foremost Norwegian philologist of his time.

== Early life and education ==
Magnus Olsen was born in Arendal, Norway on 28 November 1878, the son of merchant Ole Christian Olsen (1834–1887) and Therese Evine Olsen (1843–1926). He grew up in Arendal, where he gained his examen artium in 1896. Olsen subsequently studied philology at Royal Frederick University in Kristiania, where he took courses in Latin, Greek, German and Norwegian.

From 1899, Olsen worked as a teaching assistant at Royal Frederick University. He came under the influence of the archaeologist and toponymist Oluf Rygh, and particularly the philologist Sophus Bugge. Bugge was widely considered Norway's greatest philologist at the time, but was in the process of losing his eyesight, and Olsen served as his assistant since 1902. By this time, Bugge was preparing him to become his successor at the university. Olsen received his cand.philol. degree at the head of his class in 1903.

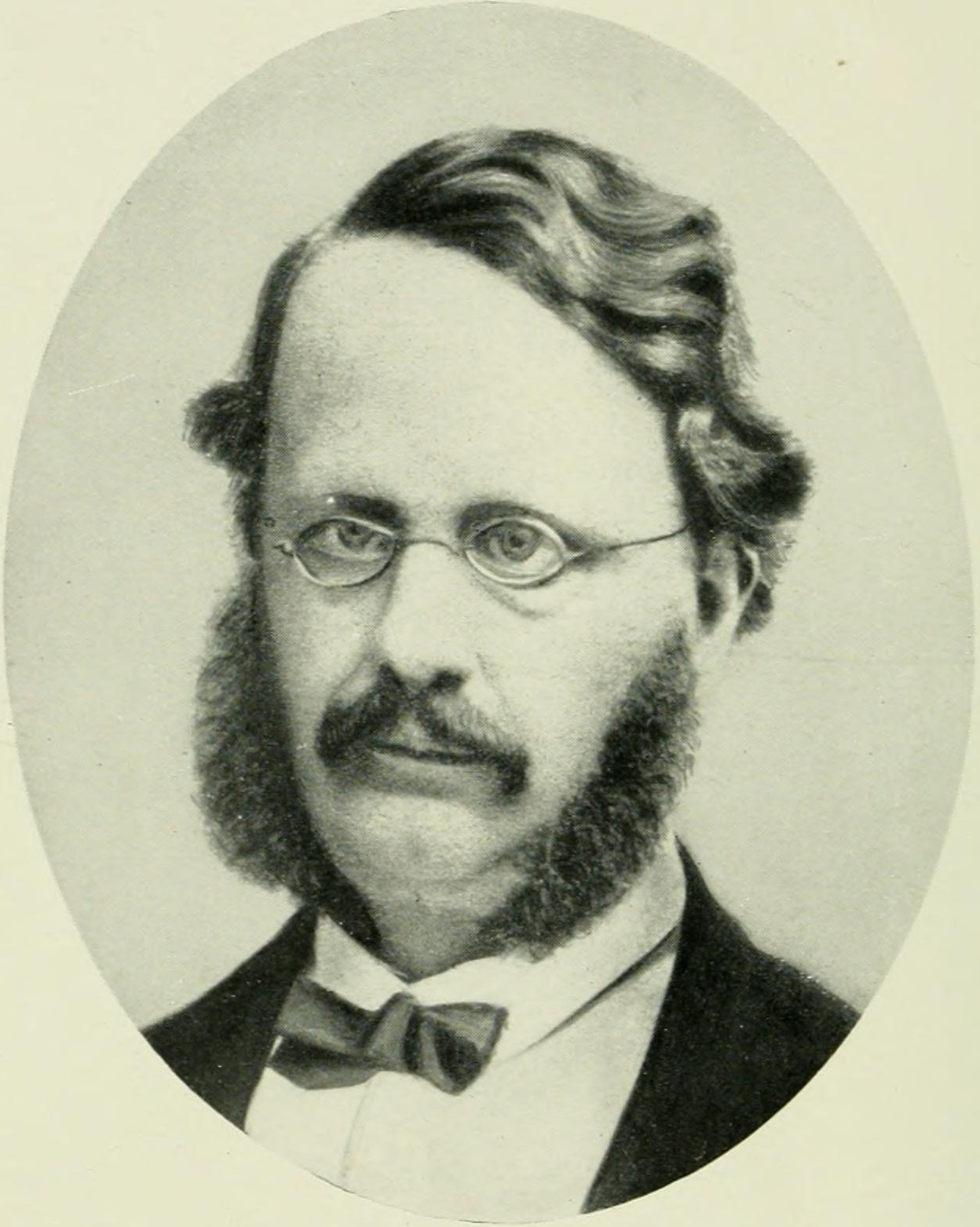
Photograph of Sophus Bugge, who was Olsen's mentor and predecessor as Professor of Old Norwegian and Icelandic Literature at Royal Frederick University in Kristiania.

== Early career ==
Upon graduating, Olsen was employed as a researcher at his university, where he became involved in the teaching of students. In 1905–1906 he was in Copenhagen working on the publication of a critical edition of the Vǫlsunga saga and Ragnars saga loðbrókar.

After Bugge's death, Olsen succeeded him in 1908 as professor of Old Norwegian and Icelandic Literature at Royal Frederick University. He saw philology as the key to understanding life in the past, particularly the Viking Age. Olsen became widely regarded as the foremost Norwegian philologist of his time. He advocated an interdisciplinary approach to this subject. His main fields of interest were Old Norse literature, runology, and toponymy. Olsen was known for the boldness of his interpretations, and believed, like his mentor Bugge, that making an interpretation rooted in sound methodology was better than making no interpretation at all. At the university, he was considered a brilliant teacher but a feared examiner. He saw teaching and research as the best way he could serve his fatherland. Olsen ensured that students of high ability had their works published, and that a fund was established to make help students from poor families gain a university education. He supervised the education of generations of Norwegian academics and teachers, and together with scholars such as Carl Marstrander, Olsen developed Royal Frederick University into one of the world's leading institutions on Germanic philology. Among the students who took courses under Olsen was Lee M. Hollander.

In 1909, Olsen founded the journal Maal og Minne, which he personally edited for forty years. The first issue included his inaugural lecture on the Skírnismál, in which he presented parallels between Njörðr of Norse mythology and Nerthus mentioned by Tacitus. Olsen married Gjertrud Mathilde Kjær, daughter of university librarian Albert Kjær (1852–1941) and Johanne Marie Torp (1863–1948), on 28 June 1912. In 1911, he became a corresponding member of the Royal Swedish Academy of Letters, History and Antiquities. From 1914 to 1956, Olsen was the editor of Bidrag til nordisk filologi. Between 1910 and 1924, he authored three volumes of the monumental Norske Gaardnavne, which examined the toponymy of Norwegian farms. The third volume was authored together with Just Knud Qvigstad. Olsen eventually assumed responsibility for the publication of this series, and had assisted its prior publisher Oluf Rygh. Two of his best known publications are Hedenske kultminder i norske stedsnavne (1915) and Ættegård og helligdom (1926), which used toponymic evidence to examine Old Norse religion; these pioneering works made significant contributions to its scholarship. Notably, the evidence presented by Olsen showed that the Norse gods were venerated not only as creatures from another world, but as powers intertwined with the environment of the people. His Ættegård og helligdom was eventually translated into English and published under the title Farms and Fanes of Ancient Norway (1928). Gabriel Turville-Petre mentions Olsen along with Georges Dumézil and Jan de Vries as one of the most influential scholars on Old Norse religion. Olsen's research on Scandinavian place names were instrumental in restoring confidence in Icelandic literature as a useful source of information on Old Norse religion.

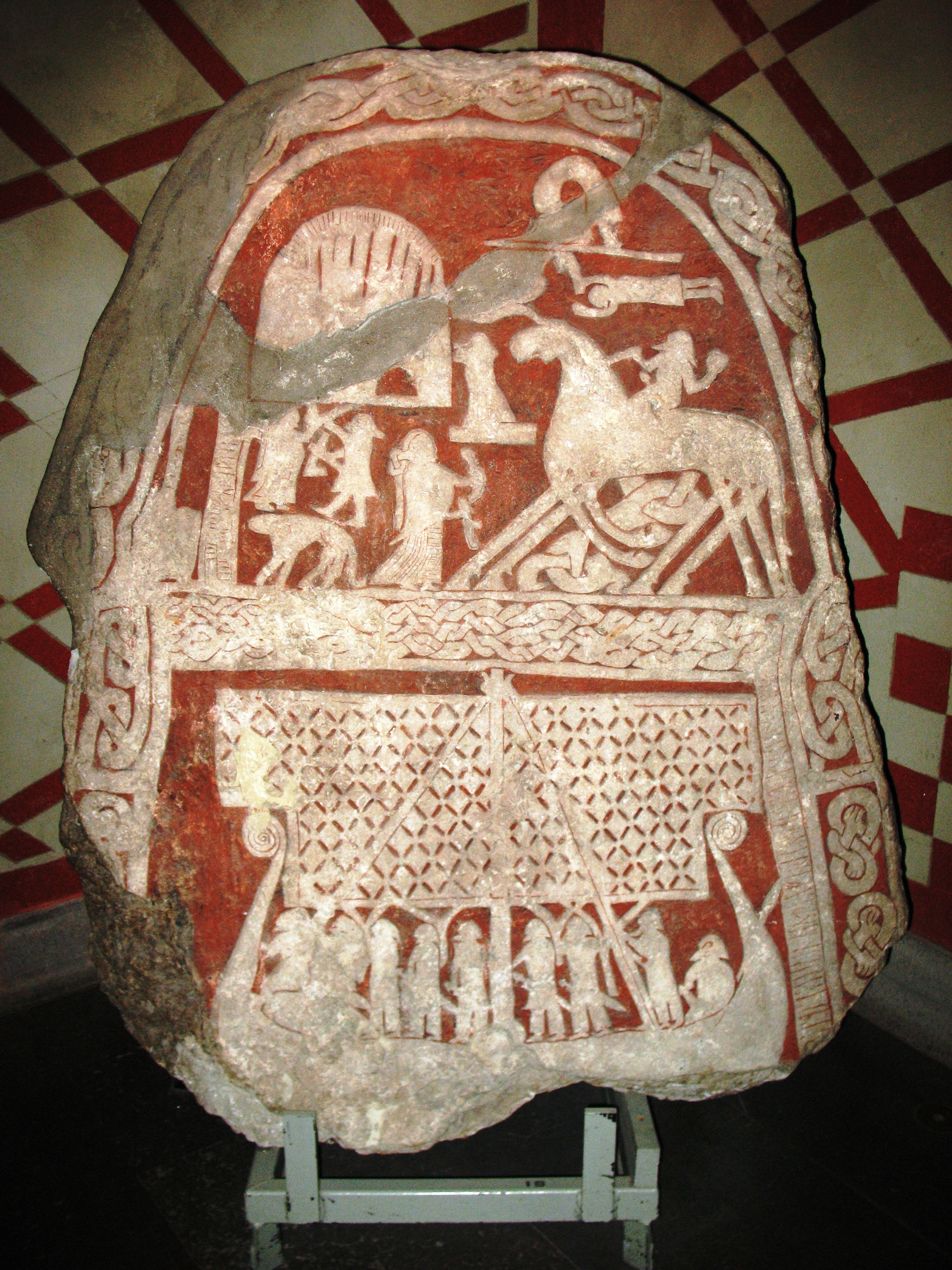
The Tjängvide image stone depicts the Old Norse god Odin entering Valhalla on his horse Sleipnir. Old Norse religion and runology was of particular interest to Olsen's research.

Olsen's research on runology was significant. He succeeded Bugge as the publisher of Norges innskrifter med de ældre runer volumes (Norwegian Runic Inscriptions in the Older Runes), which examined Elder Futhark inscriptions in Norway. By 1924, it had been published in five volumes. Between 1941 and 1960, he published his subsequent Norges innskrifter med de yngre runer (Norwegian Inscriptions in the younger Runes) in five volumes. This work examined Younger Futhark inscriptions in Norway. Vols. 3–5 were published in cooperation with Aslak Liestøl. Olsen was convinced that runes were not merely used as an instrument for communication, but were also believed to have magical purposes.

== World War II ==
During the German occupation of Norway in World War II, Olsen distinguished himself as a fierce opponent of Nazism, and was close to the resistance movement at the university. He was among the professors at the University of Oslo who on 15 May 1941 issued a public denunciation of the crimes of Josef Terboven against the Norwegian people. Upon the arrest of Francis Bull by the German authorities, Olsen replaced him as acting dean at the University of Oslo. On 15 October 1943, he was arrested by the German occupation authorities and interned at Bredtveit internment camp. He was however quickly released, and continued his involvement with the resistance.

== Later career ==
Olsen retired from his professorship upon reaching the age limit in 1948, but continued to research and write. He was appointed a Commander of the Order of St. Olav in 1945. He was also a recipient of the Grand Knight's Cross of the Order of the Falcon and the Knight of the Order of the Polar Star, and a recipient of honorary doctorates from several universities. Olsen was a member of a large number of scholarly societies, including the Norwegian Academy of Science and Letters (1904) and the Royal Norwegian Society of Sciences and Letters, and a corresponding member of the Göttingen Academy of Sciences and Humanities.

During his last years, Olsen made important contributions to the field of Eddaic studies. His Edda- og skaldekvad. Forarbeider til kommentar, published in seven volumes between 1960 and 1964, examined the Eddas and Skaldic poetry. It contributed to the development of a relative chronology for these works. Throughout his career, he authored hundreds of scholarly books and articles. He died in Oslo, Norway on 16 January 1963.

== Selected publications ==
- Olsen, Magnus; Bugge, Sophus, eds. (1891–1924). Norges Indskrifter med de ældre Runer [Norwegian Inscriptions in Elder Futhark]. Vol. 1–4. Kristiania: A. W. Brøggers Bogtrykkeri.
- Tre orknøske runeindskrifter [Three Orcadian Runic Inscriptions]. Kristiania: J. Dybwad. 1903.
- Völsunga saga ok Ragnars saga loðbrókar [The Saga of the Völsungs and the Saga of Ragnar Lodbrok]. Copenhagen: S.L. Møllers bogtrykkeri. 1908.
- Rygh, Oluf, ed. (1910). Søndre Bergenhus amt [Søndre Bergenhus County]. Norske gaardnavne. Vol. 11. Kristiania: W. C. Fabritius.
- Stedsnavnestudier [Place Name Studies]. Kristiania: H. Aschehoug. 1912.
- Hedenske kultminder i norske stedsnavne [Heathen Cultic Memories in Norwegian Place Names]. Kristiania: J. Dybwad. 1915.
- Rygh, Oluf, ed. (1915). Stavanger amt [Stavanger County]. Norske gaardnavne. Vol. 10. Kristiania: W. C. Fabritius.
- Olsen, Magnus, ed. (1922). Norrøne Gude- og Heltesagn [Old Norse Sagas of Gods and Heroes]. Kristiania: P.F. Steensballe.
- Olsen, Magnus; Qvigstad, Just Knud, eds. (1924). Finmarkens amt [Finnmark County]. Norske gaardnavne. Vol. 18. Oslo: W. C. Fabritius.
- Ættegård og helligdom: Norske stedsnavn sosialt og religionshistorisk belyst [Ancestral Farms and Holiness: Norwegian Place Names in a Social and Religious-Historical Light]. Oslo: Institutted for sammenlignende kulturforskning. 1926. ISBN 9788200052111.
- Farms and Fanes of Ancient Norway: The Place-Names of a Country Discussed in Their Bearings on Social and Religious History. Oslo: H. Aschehoug. 1928.
- Stedsnavn og gudeminner i Land [Place Names and Memories of Gods in Land]. Oslo: J. Dybwad. 1929.
- Hvad våre stedsnavn lærer oss [What We Can Learn From Our Place Names]. Oslo: J.M. Stenersens Forlag. 1934. OCLC 491675968.
- Runekammen fra Setre [The Runic Comb of Setre]. Bergen: Grieg. 1934. OCLC 251995832.
- Norrøne studier [Old Norse Studies]. Oslo: H. Aschehoug. 1938.
- Stedsnavn [Place Names]. Oslo: H. Aschehoug. 1939.
- Olsen, Magnus; Liestøl, Just Aslak (1941–1960). Norges innskrifter med de yngre runer [Norwegian Inscriptions in Younger Futhark]. Vol. 1–5. Oslo: J. Dybwad. ISBN 9788270610228.
- Fra norrøn filologi [From Old Norse Philology]. Oslo: H. Aschehoug. 1949.
- Edda- og skaldekvad [Eddaic- and Skaldic Poetry]. Vol. 1–7. Oslo: H. Aschehoug. 1960–1964.
