= Medieval Unicode Font Initiative =

Project coordinating the encoding of medieval texts using the Private Use Area

Insular G, a shape of the Latin letter G once used in Ireland and Great Britain. Unicode encoded it as: Ᵹᵹ

Insular R (Encoded as: Ꞃꞃ)

In digital typography, the Medieval Unicode Font Initiative (MUFI) is a project which aims to coordinate the encoding and display of special characters in medieval texts written in the Latin alphabet or in runes, which are not otherwise encoded as part of Unicode.

== Organization ==
MUFI was founded in July 2001 by a workgroup consisting of Odd Einar Haugen (Bergen), Alec McAllister (Leeds), and Tarrin Wills (Sydney). From 2006 to 2015, MUFI had a board of four members, consisting of the three founding members and Andreas Stötzner (Leipzig). Currently board consists of Tarrin Wills, Copenhagen (Chair), Alex Speed Kjeldsen, Copenhagen (Deputy chair), Odd Einar Haugen, Bergen and Beeke Stegmann, Iceland.

== Character variants ==
In medieval texts, many special ligatures, scribal abbreviations, and letter forms existed, which are no longer a part of the Latin alphabet. As few of these characters are encoded in Unicode, ligatures have to be broken up into separate letters when digitized. Since few fonts support medieval ligatures or alternative letter forms, it is difficult to transmit them reliably in digital formats.

To prevent the possibility of corruption of the source texts, the eventual goal of the MUFI is to create a consensus on which characters to encode, and then present a completed proposal to the Unicode Consortium. In the meantime, a part of the Private Use Area has been assigned for encoding, so these characters can be placed in typefaces for testing and to speed up the later transition to the final encodings (if the project is accepted). This was originally based upon work done by the TITUS project, which also deals with Greek, Cyrillic, Georgian, Arabic and Devanagari characters. As of Unicode 5.1, this proposal has been made, covering 152 characters, and most of these (89 in all) have been encoded in the Latin Extended-D block. Others are in the Combining Diacritical Marks Supplement (26 chars.), Latin Extended Additional (10 chars.), Supplemental Punctuation (15 chars.) and Ancient Symbols (12 chars.).

== Fonts ==
As of September 2017, Junicode (GPL) is the first typeface to cover all of MUFI 4.0, also in its italic face. Prior to MUFI 4.0, there were some 39 code point conflicts with Junicode.

The Kurinto Font Folio has two typefaces – Kurinto Book UFI and Kurinto Roma UFI – that cover all of MUFI as of July 5, 2020, including code points added after version 4.0 of MUFI. Kurinto also includes the code points of the CYFI and RUFI standards.

There are three typefaces that are confirmed to cover all of MUFI 3.0. These are Cardo, Andron Scriptor Web and Palemonas MUFI. Only the last one comes in four faces (regular, italic, bold and both).

LeedsUni supports all of MUFI 2.0. Caudex, which is available at Google Fonts for embedding, claims to support most of MUFI 3.0, but is not listed on the MUFI homepage. Alphabetum has an almost complete coverage of MUFI 2.0 and some coverage of version 3.0, in addition to a complete coverage of MUFI 1.0.

TITUS Cyberbit covers all of MUFI 1.0 and includes some additional characters at different places, as it predates the MUFI project.

There is a project to make available MUFI characters, including version 4.0 ones, in LaTeX.

== Private Use Area ==
The MUFI set includes standardized characters from many areas in the Basic Multilingual Plane and includes named character references ("entities") for use in SGML and XML, especially in TEI formats such as Menota. It also specifies many characters that are not encoded in Unicode, yet, in the Private Use Area which is designated for such use. When MUFI PUA characters have been accepted for encoding they are removed from the PUA in subsequent versions. As of version 4.0 there are the following PUA assignments, organized into several sub-areas.

MUFI assignments in the Private Use Area: Category 1 – Base characters
Char	Position	Descriptive name	Entity
PUA-1: Ligatures
	U+E8C1	LATIN SMALL LETTER THORN LIGATED WITH ARM OF LATIN SMALL LETTER R	&thornrarmlig;
	U+E8C2	LATIN CAPITAL LETTER H LIGATED WITH ARM OF LATIN SMALL LETTER R	&Hrarmlig;
	U+E8C3	LATIN SMALL LETTER H LIGATED WITH ARM OF LATIN SMALL LETTER R	&hrarmlig;
	U+E8C5	LATIN SMALL LETTER K LIGATED WITH ARM OF LATIN SMALL LETTER R	&krarmlig;
	U+EAD0	LATIN SMALL LIGATURE GR	&grlig;
	U+EAD1	LATIN SMALL LIGATURE Q INSULAR V	&qvinslig;
	U+EAD2	LATIN SMALL LIGATURE GP	&gplig;
	U+EADA	LATIN SMALL LIGATURE LONG S DESCENDING T	&slongdestlig;
	U+EBA0	LATIN SMALL LIGATURE LONG S A WITH DIAERESIS	&slongaumllig;
	U+EBA1	LATIN SMALL LIGATURE LONG S H	&slonghlig;
	U+EBA2	LATIN SMALL LIGATURE LONG S I	&slongilig;
	U+EBA3	LATIN SMALL LIGATURE LONG S L	&slongllig;
	U+EBA4	LATIN SMALL LIGATURE LONG S O WITH DIAERESIS	&slongoumllig;
	U+EBA5	LATIN SMALL LIGATURE LONG S P	&slongplig;
	U+EBA6	LATIN SMALL LIGATURE LONG S LONG S	&slongslonglig;
	U+EBA7	LATIN SMALL LIGATURE LONG S LONG S I	&slongslongilig;
	U+EBA8	LATIN SMALL LIGATURE LONG S LONG S L	&slongslongllig;
	U+EBA9	LATIN SMALL LIGATURE LONG S TI	&slongtilig;
	U+EBAA	LATIN SMALL LIGATURE LONG S TR	&slongtrlig;
	U+EBAB	LATIN SMALL LIGATURE LONG S U WITH DIAERESIS	&slonguumllig;
	U+EBAC	LATIN SMALL LIGATURE LONG S INSULAR V	&slongvinslig;
	U+EEC2	LATIN SMALL LIGATURE BB	&bblig;
	U+EEC3	LATIN SMALL LIGATURE BG	&bglig;
	U+EEC4	LATIN SMALL LIGATURE CK	&cklig;
	U+EEC5	LATIN SMALL LIGATURE CT	&ctlig;
	U+EEC7	LATIN SMALL LIGATURE EY	&eylig;
	U+EEC8	LATIN SMALL LIGATURE F A WITH DIAERESIS	&faumllig;
	U+EEC9	LATIN SMALL LIGATURE FJ	&fjlig;
	U+EECA	LATIN SMALL LIGATURE FR	&frlig;
	U+EECB	LATIN SMALL LIGATURE FT	&ftlig;
	U+EECC	LATIN SMALL LIGATURE F U WITH DIAERESIS	&fuumllig;
	U+EECD	LATIN SMALL LIGATURE FY	&fylig;
	U+EECE	LATIN SMALL LIGATURE FFT	&fftlig;
	U+EECF	LATIN SMALL LIGATURE FFY	&ffylig;
	U+EED0	LATIN SMALL LIGATURE FTY	&ftylig;
	U+EED1	LATIN SMALL LIGATURE GG	&gglig;
	U+EED2	LATIN SMALL LIGATURE GD	&gdlig;
	U+EED3	LATIN SMALL LIGATURE G D ROTUNDA	&gdrotlig;
	U+EED4	LATIN SMALL LIGATURE G ETH	&gethlig;
	U+EED5	LATIN SMALL LIGATURE SMALL CAPITAL N LONG S	&nscapslonglig;
	U+EED6	LATIN SMALL LIGATURE PP	&pplig;
	U+EED7	LATIN SMALL LIGATURE PP WITH FLOURISH	&ppflourlig;
	U+EED8	LATIN SMALL LIGATURE TR	&trlig;
	U+EED9	LATIN SMALL LIGATURE TT	&ttlig;
	U+EEDA	LATIN SMALL LIGATURE T ROTUNDA T ROTUNDA	&trottrotlig;
	U+EEDB	LATIN SMALL LIGATURE TY	&tylig;
	U+EEDC	LATIN SMALL LIGATURE TZ	&tzlig;
	U+EEDD	LATIN CAPITAL LIGATURE PP	&PPlig;
	U+EEDE	LATIN SMALL LIGATURE GO	&golig;
	U+EFA0	LATIN SMALL LIGATURE AA CLOSED FORM	&aacloselig;
	U+EFA1	LATIN SMALL LIGATURE NECKLESS A E	&anecklesselig;
	U+EFA2	LATIN SMALL LIGATURE NECKLESS A V	&anecklessvlig;
	U+EFA3	LATIN SMALL LIGATURE AF	&aflig;
	U+EFA4	LATIN SMALL LIGATURE A INSULAR F	&afinslig;
	U+EFA5	LATIN SMALL LIGATURE AG	&aglig;
	U+EFA6	LATIN SMALL LIGATURE AL	&allig;
	U+EFA7	LATIN SMALL LIGATURE AN	&anlig;
	U+EFA8	LATIN SMALL LIGATURE A SMALL CAPITAL N	&anscaplig;
	U+EFA9	LATIN SMALL LIGATURE AP	&aplig;
	U+EFAA	LATIN SMALL LIGATURE AR	&arlig;
	U+EFAB	LATIN SMALL LIGATURE A SMALL CAPITAL R	&arscaplig;
	U+EFAC	LATIN SMALL LIGATURE A THORN	&athornlig;
	U+EFAD	LATIN SMALL LIGATURE OC	&oclig;
	U+EFAE	LATIN CAPITAL LIGATURE NECKLESS A E	&AnecklessElig;
	U+F1BC	LATIN SMALL LIGATURE F O WITH DIAERESIS	&foumllig;
	U+F205	LATIN CAPITAL LIGATURE AO NECKLESS	&AOligred;
	U+F206	LATIN SMALL LIGATURE AO NECKLESS	&aoligred;
	U+F4F9	LATIN SMALL LIGATURE LL	&lllig;
	U+F4FA	LATIN SMALL LIGATURE LONG S CH	&slongchlig;
	U+F4FB	LATIN SMALL LIGATURE LONG S J	&slongjlig;
	U+F4FC	LATIN SMALL LIGATURE LONG S K	&slongklig;
	U+F4FD	LATIN SMALL LIGATURE LONG S S	&slongslig;
	U+F4FE	LATIN SMALL LIGATURE LONG S LONG S K	&slongslongklig;
	U+F4FF	LATIN SMALL LIGATURE LONG S LONG S T	&slongslongtlig;
	U+E8C6	LATIN CAPITAL LIGATURE UU	&UUlig;
	U+E8C7	LATIN SMALL LIGATURE UU	&uulig;
	U+E8C8	LATIN CAPITAL LIGATURE UE	&UElig;
	U+E8C9	LATIN SMALL LIGATURE UE	&uelig;
	U+E8DE	LATIN SMALL LIGATURE O R ROTUNDA	&orrotlig;
	U+E8DF	LATIN SMALL LIGATURE LONG S L WITH STROKE	&slonglbarlig;
	U+F1BB	LATIN SMALL LIGATURE CH	&chlig;
PUA-2: Small capitals
	U+EF0C	LATIN LETTER SMALL CAPITAL Q	&qscap;
	U+EF11	LATIN LETTER SMALL CAPITAL X	&xscap;
	U+EF15	LATIN LETTER SMALL CAPITAL THORN	&thornscap;
PUA-3: Enlarged forms
	U+EAF0	LATIN ENLARGED LETTER SMALL A WITH ACUTE	&aenlacute;
	U+EAF1	LATIN ENLARGED LETTER SMALL LIGATURE AE	&aeligenl;
	U+EAF2	LATIN LIGATURE ENLARGED LETTER SMALL A AND LATIN SMALL LETTER O	&aenlosmalllig;
	U+EAF3	LATIN ENLARGED LETTER SMALL E WITH OGONEK	&eogonenl;
	U+EEDF	LATIN ENLARGED LETTER SMALL LONG S	&slongenl;
	U+EEE0	LATIN ENLARGED LETTER SMALL A	&aenl;
	U+EEE1	LATIN ENLARGED LETTER SMALL B	&benl;
	U+EEE2	LATIN ENLARGED LETTER SMALL C	&cenl;
	U+EEE3	LATIN ENLARGED LETTER SMALL D	&denl;
	U+EEE4	LATIN ENLARGED LETTER D ROTUNDA	&drotenl;
	U+EEE5	LATIN ENLARGED LETTER SMALL ETH	&ethenl;
	U+EEE6	LATIN ENLARGED LETTER SMALL E	&eenl;
	U+EEE7	LATIN ENLARGED LETTER SMALL F	&fenl;
	U+EEE8	LATIN ENLARGED LETTER SMALL G	&genl;
	U+EEE9	LATIN ENLARGED LETTER SMALL H	&henl;
	U+EEEA	LATIN ENLARGED LETTER SMALL I	&ienl;
	U+EEEB	LATIN ENLARGED LETTER SMALL J	&jenl;
	U+EEEC	LATIN ENLARGED LETTER SMALL K	&kenl;
	U+EEED	LATIN ENLARGED LETTER SMALL L	&lenl;
	U+EEEE	LATIN ENLARGED LETTER SMALL M	&menl;
	U+EEEF	LATIN ENLARGED LETTER SMALL N	&nenl;
	U+EEF0	LATIN ENLARGED LETTER SMALL O	&oenl;
	U+EEF1	LATIN ENLARGED LETTER SMALL P	&penl;
	U+EEF2	LATIN ENLARGED LETTER SMALL Q	&qenl;
	U+EEF3	LATIN ENLARGED LETTER SMALL R	&renl;
	U+EEF4	LATIN ENLARGED LETTER SMALL S	&senl;
	U+EEF5	LATIN ENLARGED LETTER SMALL T	&tenl;
	U+EEF6	LATIN ENLARGED LETTER SMALL THORN	&thornenl;
	U+EEF7	LATIN ENLARGED LETTER SMALL U	&uenl;
	U+EEF8	LATIN ENLARGED LETTER SMALL V	&venl;
	U+EEF9	LATIN ENLARGED LETTER SMALL W	&wenl;
	U+EEFA	LATIN ENLARGED LETTER SMALL X	&xenl;
	U+EEFB	LATIN ENLARGED LETTER SMALL Y	&yenl;
	U+EEFC	LATIN ENLARGED LETTER SMALL Z	&zenl;
	U+EEFD	LATIN ENLARGED LETTER SMALL DOTLESS I	&inodotenl;
	U+EEFE	LATIN ENLARGED LETTER SMALL DOTLESS J	&jnodotenl;
	U+EEFF	LATIN ENLARGED LETTER SMALL INSULAR F	&finsenl;
	U+EFDD	LATIN ENLARGED LETTER SMALL LIGATURE OE	&oeligenl;
	U+EFDE	LATIN ENLARGED LETTER SMALL LIGATURE AO	&aoligenl;
	U+EFDF	LATIN ENLARGED LETTER SMALL LIGATURE AA	&aaligenl;
PUA-4: Abbreviation symbols
	U+F142	LATIN ABBREVIATION SIGN CAPITAL ET	&ET;
	U+F158	LATIN ABBREVIATION SIGN SMALL ET WITH STROKE	&etslash;
	U+F159	LATIN ABBREVIATION SIGN SMALL DE	&de;
	U+F159	LATIN SMALL LETTER D ROTUNDA WITH BAR	&drotbar;
	U+F1A5	LATIN ABBREVIATION SIGN SPACING BASE-LINE CAPITAL US	&USbase;
	U+F1A6	LATIN ABBREVIATION SIGN SPACING BASE-LINE US	&usbase;
	U+F1A7	LATIN ABBREVIATION SIGN CAPITAL ET WITH STROKE	&ETslash;
	U+F1AC	LATIN ABBREVIATION SIGN SEMICOLON	&sem;
	U+E8A3	LATIN ABBREVIATION SIGN AUTEM	&autem;
PUA-5: Strokes and slashes
	U+E337	LATIN CAPITAL LETTER THORN WITH DIAGONAL STROKE	&THORNbarslash;
	U+E734	LATIN SMALL LIGATURE THORN AND LONG S	&thornslonglig;
	U+E735	LATIN SMALL LIGATURE THORN AND LONG S WITH STROKE	&thornslongligbar;
	U+E7C7	LATIN SMALL LIGATURE H AND LONG S WITH STROKE	&hslongligbar;
	U+E7C8	LATIN SMALL LIGATURE K AND LONG S WITH STROKE	&kslongligbar;
	U+E7E4	LATIN SMALL LETTER R WITH LONG LEG AND STROKE THROUGH DESCENDER	&rdesstrok;
	U+E8B3	LATIN SMALL LETTER Q LIGATED WITH R ROTUNDA	&q2app;
	U+E8B4	LATIN SMALL LETTER Q WITH CENTRAL SLANTED STROKE	&qcentrslstrok;
	U+E8B7	LATIN SMALL LETTER LONG S WITH FLOURISH	&slongflour;
	U+E8B8	LATIN SMALL LETTER LONG S WITH SLANTED DESCENDING STROKE	&slongslstrok;
	U+E8BA	LATIN SMALL LETTER V WITH SHORT SLASH	&vslash;
	U+E8BD	LATIN SMALL LETTER X WITH SHORT SLASH ABOVE	&xslashula;
	U+E8BE	LATIN SMALL LETTER X WITH SHORT SLASH BELOW	&xslashlra;
	U+E8BF	LATIN SMALL LETTER Q LIGATED WITH FINAL ET	&q3app;
	U+EBAD	LATIN SMALL LIGATURE H AND LONG S	&hslonglig;
	U+EBAE	LATIN SMALL LIGATURE K AND LONG S	&kslonglig;
	U+F149	LATIN SMALL LETTER THORN WITH DIAGONAL STROKE	&thornbarslash;
	U+E8A1	LATIN SMALL LETTER I WITH TWO STROKES	&idblstrok;
	U+E8A2	LATIN SMALL LETTER J WITH TWO STROKES	&jdblstrok;
	U+E8BB	LATIN SMALL LETTER V WITH SHORT SLASH ABOVE RIGHT	&vslashura;
	U+E8BC	LATIN SMALL LETTER V WITH TWO SHORT SLASHES ABOVE RIGHT	&vslashuradbl;
	U+E8CE	LATIN SMALL LETTER X WITH TWO SHORT SLASHES BELOW RIGHT	&xslashlradbl;
PUA-6: Combining marks
◌	U+F153	COMBINING ABBREVIATION MARK SUPERSCRIPT UR ROUND R FORM	&urrot;
◌	U+F1C0	COMBINING ABBREVIATION MARK BAR ABOVE WITH DOT	&arbar;
◌	U+F1C1	COMBINING ABBREVIATION MARK SUPERSCRIPT RA OPEN A FORM WITH BAR ABOVE	&rabar;
◌	U+F1C2	COMBINING ABBREVIATION MARK SUPERSCRIPT UR LEMNISKATE FORM	&urlemn;
◌	U+F1C5	COMBINING CURL HIGH POSITION	&combcurlhigh;
◌	U+F1C7	COMBINING ABBREVIATION MARK ZIGZAG ABOVE ANGLE FORM	&erang;
◌	U+F1C8	COMBINING ABBREVIATION MARK ZIGZAG ABOVE CURLY FORM	&ercurl;
◌	U+F1CA	COMBINING DOT ABOVE HIGH POSITION	&combdothigh;
◌	U+F1CC	COMBINING CURLY BAR ABOVE	&combcurlbar;
◌	U+F1FC	COMBINING TRIPLE BREVE BELOW	&combtripbrevebl;
PUA-7: Combining letters
◌	U+F012	COMBINING LATIN SMALL LETTER B	&bsup;
◌	U+F013	COMBINING LATIN LETTER SMALL CAPITAL B	&bscapsup;
◌	U+F016	COMBINING LATIN LETTER SMALL CAPITAL D	&dscapsup;
◌	U+F017	COMBINING LATIN SMALL LETTER F	&fsup;
◌	U+F01C	COMBINING LATIN LETTER SMALL CAPITAL K	&kscapsup;
◌	U+F025	COMBINING LATIN SMALL LETTER P	&psup;
◌	U+F02A	COMBINING LATIN LETTER SMALL CAPITAL T	&tscapsup;
◌	U+F02B	COMBINING LATIN SMALL LETTER Y	&ysup;
◌	U+F02F	COMBINING LATIN SMALL LETTER DOTLESS I	&inodotsup;
◌	U+F030	COMBINING LATIN SMALL LETTER J	&jsup;
◌	U+F031	COMBINING LATIN SMALL LETTER DOTLESS J	&jnodotsup;
◌	U+F032	COMBINING LATIN LETTER SMALL O WITH STROKE	&oslashsup;
◌	U+F033	COMBINING LATIN SMALL LETTER Q	&qsup;
◌	U+F036	COMBINING LATIN SMALL LIGATURE AN	&anligsup;
◌	U+F038	COMBINING LATIN SMALL LIGATURE AR	&arligsup;
◌	U+F03A	COMBINING LATIN SMALL LIGATURE A SMALL CAPITAL N	&anscapligsup;
◌	U+F03B	COMBINING LATIN LETTER T ROTUNDA	&trotsup;
◌	U+F03C	COMBINING LATIN SMALL LETTER W	&wsup;
◌	U+F03D	COMBINING LATIN SMALL LETTER THORN	&thornsup;
◌	U+F03E	COMBINING LATIN SMALL LETTER O R ROTUNDA	&orrotsup;
◌	U+F03F	COMBINING LATIN SMALL LETTER O RUM	&orumsup;
◌	U+F040	COMBINING LATIN SMALL LETTER RUM	&rumsup;
◌	U+F130	COMBINING LATIN SMALL LIGATURE A SMALL CAPITAL R	&arscapligsup;
◌	U+F135	COMBINING LATIN SMALL LETTER E WITH OGONEK	&eogonsup;
◌	U+F136	COMBINING LATIN SMALL LETTER E WITH MACRON	&emacrsup;
◌	U+F13E	COMBINING LATIN SMALL LETTER O WITH OGONEK	&oogonsup;
◌	U+F13F	COMBINING LATIN SMALL LETTER O WITH MACRON	&omacrsup;
PUA-8: Punctuation marks
	U+F160	PUNCTUS INTERROGATIVUS	&punctinter;
	U+F161	PUNCTUS ELEVATUS	&punctelev;
	U+F1E0	MEDIEVAL COMMA	&medcom;
	U+F1E1	PARAGRAPHUS	&parag;
	U+F1E2	COMMA POSITURA	&posit;
	U+F1E3	HIGH COMMA POSITURA (SIMPLEX DUCTUS)	&ductsimpl;
	U+F1E4	PUNCTUS WITH COMMA POSITURA	&punctposit;
	U+F1E5	COLON WITH MIDDLE COMMA POSITURA	&colmidcomposit;
	U+F1E6	THREE DOTS WITH COMMA POSITURA	&tridotscomposit;
	U+F1E7	PUNCTUS EXCLAMATIVUS	&punctexclam;
	U+F1E8	PUNCTUS INTERROGATIVUS HORIZONTAL TILDE	&punctintertilde;
	U+F1EA	PUNCTUS VERSUS	&punctvers;
	U+F1EC	SIGNE DE RENVOI	&renvoi;
	U+F1F0	PUNCTUS ELEVATUS DIAGONAL STROKE	&punctelevdiag;
	U+F1F1	PUNCTUS INTERROGATIVUS LEMNISKATE FORM	&punctinterlemn;
	U+F1F2	TWO DOTS OVER COMMA POSITURA	&bidotscomposit;
	U+F1F4	VIRGULA SUSPENSIVA	&virgsusp;
	U+F1F5	PUNCTUS FLEXUS	&punctflex;
	U+F1F7	SHORT VIRGULA	&virgmin;
	U+F1F8	DISTINCTIO	&hidot;
	U+F1F9	WAVY LINE	&wavylin;
	U+F1FA	PUNCTUS ELEVATUS WITH HIGH BACK	&punctelevhiback;
	U+F1FB	PUNCTUS ELEVATUS WITH ONSET	&punctelevhack;
	U+F1D2	TRIPLE DAGGER SIGN	&tridagger;
PUA-9: Symbols
	U+F1DA	MIDDLE RING	&midring;
	U+F1DB	PALM BRANCH	&ramus;
PUA-10: Metrical symbols
	U+F700	METRICAL SYMBOL LONGUM	&metrmacr;
	U+F701	METRICAL SYMBOL BREVE	&metrbreve;
	U+F702	METRICAL SYMBOL BREVE ABOVE LONGUM (SHORT OR LONG SYLLABLE)	&metrmacrbreve;
	U+F703	METRICAL SYMBOL LONGUM ABOVE BREVE (SHORT OR LONG SYLLABLE)	&metrbrevemacr;
	U+F704	METRICAL SYMBOL LONGUM WITH ACUTE (PRIMARY STRESS)	&metrmacracute;
	U+F705	METRICAL SYMBOL LONGUM WITH GRAVE (SECONDARY STRESS)	&metrmacrgrave;
	U+F706	METRICAL SYMBOL BREVE WITH ACUTE (PRIMARY STRESS)	&metrbreveacute;
	U+F707	METRICAL SYMBOL BREVE WITH GRAVE (SECONDARY STRESS)	&metrbrevegrave;
	U+F708	METRICAL SYMBOL BREVE ABOVE LONGUM WITH ACUTE (SHORT OR LONG SYLLABLE WITH PRIMARY STRESS)	&metrmacrbreveacute;
	U+F709	METRICAL SYMBOL BREVE ABOVE LONGUM WITH GRAVE (SHORT OR LONG SYLLABLE WITH SECONDARY STRESS)	&metrmacrbrevegrave;
	U+F70A	METRICAL SYMBOL ANCEPS	&metranc;
	U+F70B	METRICAL SYMBOL ANCEPS WITH ACUTE (PRIMARY STRESS)	&metrancacute;
	U+F70C	METRICAL SYMBOL ANCEPS WITH GRAVE (SECONDARY STRESS)	&metrancgrave;
	U+F714	METRICAL SYMBOL PAUSE	&metrpause;
	U+F715	METRICAL SYMBOL LONGUM WITH DOUBLE ACUTE (SECONDARY STRESS)	&metrmacrdblac;
	U+F716	METRICAL SYMBOL LONGUM WITH DOUBLE GRAVE (SECONDARY STRESS AND ALLITERATION)	&metrmacrdblgrave;
	U+F717	METRICAL SYMBOL BREVE WITH DOUBLE ACUTE (PRIMARY STRESS AND ALLITERATION)	&metrbrevedblac;
	U+F718	METRICAL SYMBOL BREVE WITH DOUBLE GRAVE (SECONDARY STRESS AND ALLITERATION)	&metrbrevedblgrave;
	U+F719	METRICAL SYMBOL ANCEPS WITH DOUBLE ACUTE (PRIMARY STRESS AND ALLITERATION)	&metrancdblac;
	U+F71A	METRICAL SYMBOL ANCEPS WITH DOUBLE GRAVE (SECONDARY STRESS AND ALLITERATION)	&metrancdblgrave;
	U+F71B	METRICAL SYMBOL RESOLVED LIFT WITH ACUTE (PRIMARY STRESS)	&metrdblbrevemacracute;
	U+F71C	METRICAL SYMBOL RESOLVED LIFT WITH DOUBLE ACUTE (PRIMARY STRESS AND ALLITERATION)	&metrdblbrevemacrdblac;
	U+F72E	METRICAL SYMBOL RESOLVED LIFT	&metrdblbrevemacr;
PUA-11:
	U+F1BD	SMALL BASE LINE ZERO SIGN	&smallzero;
	U+F1BF	MODIFIER CAPITAL LETTER X	&Xmod;
	U+F2FE	ROMAN NUMERAL CAPITAL C WITH TWO BARS	&Cnumbar;
	U+F2FF	ROMAN NUMERAL SMALL C WITH TWO BARS	&cnumbar;
PUA-12: Currency signs
	U+F2E0	LATIN AS LIBRALIS SIGN	&romaslibr;
	U+F2E2	LATIN SMALL CAPITAL LETTER X WITH BAR	&romscapxbar;
	U+F2E3	LATIN SMALL CAPITAL LETTER Y WITH BAR	&romscapybar;
	U+F2E4	LATIN SMALL CAPITAL LETTER D WITH SLASH	&romscapdslash;
	U+F2E6	PHARMACEUTICAL DRAM SIGN	&dram;
	U+F2E7	ECU SIGN	&ecu;
	U+F2E8	FLOREN SIGN WITH LOOP	&florloop;
	U+F2E9	GROSCHEN SIGN	&grosch;
	U+F2EA	DUTCH LIBRA SIGN	&libradut;
	U+F2EB	FRENCH LIBRA SIGN	&librafren;
	U+F2EC	ITALIAN LIBRA SIGN	&libraital;
	U+F2ED	FLEMISH LIBRA SIGN	&libraflem;
	U+F2EE	LIRA NUOVA SIGN	&liranuov;
	U+F2EF	LIRA STERLINA SIGN	&lirasterl;
	U+F2F0	OLD MARK SIGN	&markold;
	U+F2F1	OLD FLOURISH MARK SIGN	&markflour;
	U+F2F2	MARKED SMALL LETTER M SIGN	&msign;
	U+F2F3	FLOURISHED SMALL LETTER M SIGN	&msignflour;
	U+F2F4	PHARMACEUTICAL OBOLUS SIGN	&obol;
	U+F2F5	PENNING SIGN	&penningar;
	U+F2F6	OLD REICHSTALER SIGN	&reichtalold;
	U+F2F7	GERMAN SCHILLING SIGN	&schillgerm;
	U+F2F8	GERMAN SCRIPT SCHILLING SIGN	&schillgermscript;
	U+F2F9	SCUDI SIGN	&scudi;
	U+F2FD	SCRIPT OUNCE SIGN	&ouncescript;
	U+F2FA	KRONE SIGN	&krone;
	U+F2FB	HELBING SIGN	&helbing;
PUA-13: Bar
	U+E74E	LATIN SMALL LETTER V WITH BAR	&vbar;
	U+E77B	LATIN SMALL LETTER Y WITH BAR	&ybar;
	U+E7B2	LATIN SMALL LETTER N WITH BAR	&nbar;

MUFI assignments in the Private Use Area: Category 2 – Precomposed characters
Char	Position	Descriptive name	Entity
PUA-15: Macron and overline
	U+E0BC	LATIN CAPITAL LETTER E WITH OGONEK AND MACRON	&Eogonmacr;
	U+E150	LATIN CAPITAL LETTER I WITH HIGH OVERLINE (ABOVE CHARACTER)	&Iovlhigh;
	U+E152	LATIN CAPITAL LETTER J WITH HIGH OVERLINE (ABOVE CHARACTER)	&Jovlhigh;
	U+E154	LATIN CAPITAL LETTER J WITH HIGH MACRON (ABOVE CHARACTER)	&Jmacrhigh;
	U+E1B8	LATIN CAPITAL LETTER M WITH HIGH MACRON (ABOVE CHARACTER)	&Mmacrhigh;
	U+E1D2	LATIN CAPITAL LETTER M WITH HIGH OVERLINE (ABOVE CHARACTER)	&Movlhigh;
	U+E1DC	LATIN CAPITAL LETTER N WITH HIGH MACRON (ABOVE CHARACTER)	&Nmacrhigh;
	U+E252	LATIN CAPITAL LETTER O WITH STROKE AND MACRON	&Oslashmacr;
	U+E25D	LATIN CAPITAL LIGATURE OE WITH MACRON	&OEligmacr;
	U+E34D	LATIN CAPITAL LETTER V WITH MACRON	&Vmacr;
	U+E357	LATIN CAPITAL LETTER W WITH MACRON	&Wmacr;
	U+E44D	LATIN SMALL LETTER B WITH MEDIUM-HIGH OVERLINE (ACROSS ASCENDER)	&bovlmed;
	U+E491	LATIN SMALL LETTER D WITH MEDIUM-HIGH OVERLINE (ACROSS ASCENDER)	&dovlmed;
	U+E4BC	LATIN SMALL LETTER E WITH OGONEK AND MACRON	&eogonmacr;
	U+E517	LATIN SMALL LETTER H WITH MEDIUM-HIGH OVERLINE (ACROSS ASCENDER)	&hovlmed;
	U+E550	LATIN SMALL LETTER I WITH MEDIUM-HIGH OVERLINE (ABOVE CHARACTER)	&iovlmed;
	U+E552	LATIN SMALL LETTER J WITH MEDIUM-HIGH OVERLINE (ABOVE CHARACTER)	&jovlmed;
	U+E554	LATIN SMALL LETTER J WITH MEDIUM-HIGH MACRON (ABOVE CHARACTER)	&jmacrmed;
	U+E58C	LATIN SMALL LETTER L WITH HIGH OVERLINE (ABOVE CHARACTER)	&lovlhigh;
	U+E596	LATIN SMALL LETTER L WITH HIGH MACRON (ABOVE CHARACTER)	&lmacrhigh;
	U+E5B1	LATIN SMALL LETTER L WITH MEDIUM-HIGH OVERLINE (ACROSS ASCENDER)	&lovlmed;
	U+E5B8	LATIN SMALL LETTER M WITH MEDIUM-HIGH MACRON (ABOVE CHARACTER)	&mmacrmed;
	U+E5D2	LATIN SMALL LETTER M WITH MEDIUM-HIGH OVERLINE (ABOVE CHARACTER)	&movlmed;
	U+E5DC	LATIN SMALL LETTER N WITH MEDIUM-HIGH MACRON (ABOVE CHARACTER)	&nmacrmed;
	U+E652	LATIN SMALL LETTER O WITH STROKE AND MACRON	&oslashmacr;
	U+E65D	LATIN SMALL LIGATURE OE WITH MACRON	&oeligmacr;
	U+E665	LATIN SMALL LETTER P WITH MACRON	&pmacr;
	U+E681	LATIN SMALL LETTER Q WITH MACRON	&qmacr;
	U+E74D	LATIN SMALL LETTER V WITH MACRON	&vmacr;
	U+E757	LATIN SMALL LETTER W WITH MACRON	&wmacr;
	U+E79E	LATIN SMALL LETTER LONG S WITH MEDIUM-HIGH OVERLINE (ACROSS ASCENDER)	&slongovlmed;
	U+E7A2	LATIN SMALL LETTER THORN WITH MEDIUM-HIGH OVERLINE (ACROSS ASCENDER)	&thornovlmed;
	U+E7C3	LATIN SMALL LETTER K WITH MEDIUM-HIGH OVERLINE (ACROSS ASCENDER)	&kovlmed;
	U+E7CC	LATIN SMALL LETTER OPEN O WITH MACRON	&oopenmacr;
◌	U+F00A	COMBINING HIGH MACRON WITH FIXED HEIGHT (PART-WIDTH)	&macrhigh;
◌	U+F00B	COMBINING MEDIUM-HIGH MACRON WITH FIXED HEIGHT (PART-WIDTH)	&macrmed;
◌	U+F00C	COMBINING HIGH OVERLINE WITH FIXED HEIGHT (FULL-WIDTH)	&ovlhigh;
◌	U+F00D	COMBINING MEDIUM-HIGH OVERLINE WITH FIXED HEIGHT (FULL-WIDTH)	&ovlmed;
	U+F23F	ROMAN NUMERAL REVERSED ONE HUNDRED WITH OVERLINE	&romnumCrevovl;
	U+F7B2	LATIN CAPITAL LETTER V WITH HIGH OVERLINE (ABOVE CHARACTER)	&Vovlhigh;
	U+F7B3	LATIN CAPITAL LETTER X WITH HIGH OVERLINE (ABOVE CHARACTER)	&Xovlhigh;
	U+F7B4	LATIN CAPITAL LETTER L WITH HIGH OVERLINE (ABOVE CHARACTER)	&Lovlhigh;
	U+F7B5	LATIN CAPITAL LETTER C WITH HIGH OVERLINE (ABOVE CHARACTER)	&Covlhigh;
	U+F7B6	LATIN CAPITAL LETTER D WITH HIGH OVERLINE (ABOVE CHARACTER)	&Dovlhigh;
PUA-16: Acute accent
	U+E044	LATIN CAPITAL LETTER B WITH ACUTE	&Bacute;
	U+E077	LATIN CAPITAL LETTER D WITH ACUTE	&Dacute;
	U+E0F0	LATIN CAPITAL LETTER F WITH ACUTE	&Facute;
	U+E116	LATIN CAPITAL LETTER H WITH ACUTE	&Hacute;
	U+E153	LATIN CAPITAL LETTER J WITH ACUTE	&Jacute;
	U+E259	LATIN CAPITAL LIGATURE OE WITH ACUTE	&OEligacute;
	U+E2E2	LATIN CAPITAL LETTER T WITH ACUTE	&Tacute;
	U+E33A	LATIN CAPITAL LETTER V WITH ACUTE	&Vacute;
	U+E444	LATIN SMALL LETTER B WITH ACUTE	&bacute;
	U+E477	LATIN SMALL LETTER D WITH ACUTE	&dacute;
	U+E4F0	LATIN SMALL LETTER F WITH ACUTE	&facute;
	U+E516	LATIN SMALL LETTER H WITH ACUTE	&hacute;
	U+E553	LATIN SMALL LETTER J WITH ACUTE	&jacute;
	U+E659	LATIN SMALL LIGATURE OE WITH ACUTE	&oeligacute;
	U+E6E2	LATIN SMALL LETTER T WITH ACUTE	&tacute;
	U+E737	LATIN SMALL LETTER THORN WITH ACUTE	&thornacute;
	U+E73A	LATIN SMALL LETTER V WITH ACUTE	&vacute;
	U+EBAF	LATIN SMALL LETTER LONG S WITH ACUTE	&slongacute;
	U+EBB0	LATIN CAPITAL LIGATURE AV WITH STROKE AND ACUTE	&AVligslashacute;
	U+EBB1	LATIN SMALL LIGATURE AV WITH STROKE AND ACUTE	&avligslashacute;
	U+EBB2	LATIN SMALL LETTER D ROTUNDA WITH ACUTE	&drotacute;
	U+EBB3	LATIN CAPITAL LETTER INSULAR F WITH ACUTE	&Finsacute;
	U+EBB4	LATIN SMALL LETTER INSULAR F WITH ACUTE	&finsacute;
	U+EBB5	LATIN CAPITAL LETTER UNCIAL M WITH ACUTE	&Muncacute;
	U+EBB6	LATIN SMALL LETTER UNCIAL M WITH ACUTE	&muncacute;
	U+EBB9	LATIN SMALL LETTER R ROTUNDA WITH ACUTE	&rrotacute;
	U+EBBA	LATIN CAPITAL LETTER INSULAR V (VEND) WITH ACUTE	&Vinsacute;
	U+EBBB	LATIN SMALL LETTER INSULAR V (VEND) WITH ACUTE	&vinsacute;
	U+EFE0	LATIN CAPITAL LIGATURE AA WITH ACUTE	&AAligacute;
	U+EFE1	LATIN SMALL LIGATURE AA WITH ACUTE	&aaligacute;
	U+EFE2	LATIN CAPITAL LIGATURE AO WITH ACUTE	&AOligacute;
	U+EFE3	LATIN SMALL LIGATURE AO WITH ACUTE	&aoligacute;
	U+EFE4	LATIN CAPITAL LIGATURE AU WITH ACUTE	&AUligacute;
	U+EFE5	LATIN SMALL LIGATURE AU WITH ACUTE	&auligacute;
	U+EFE6	LATIN CAPITAL LIGATURE AV WITH ACUTE	&AVligacute;
	U+EFE7	LATIN SMALL LIGATURE AV WITH ACUTE	&avligacute;
	U+EFE8	LATIN CAPITAL LIGATURE OO WITH ACUTE	&OOligacute;
	U+EFE9	LATIN SMALL LIGATURE OO WITH ACUTE	&ooligacute;
	U+F23E	LATIN SMALL LETTER M UNCIAL FORM WITH ACUTE ACCENT	&muncacute;
PUA-17: Double acute accent ("Hungarian umlaut")
	U+E025	LATIN CAPITAL LETTER A WITH DOUBLE ACUTE	&Adblac;
	U+E041	LATIN CAPITAL LETTER AE WITH DOUBLE ACUTE	&AEligdblac;
	U+E0D1	LATIN CAPITAL LETTER E WITH DOUBLE ACUTE	&Edblac;
	U+E143	LATIN CAPITAL LETTER I WITH DOUBLE ACUTE	&Idblac;
	U+E162	LATIN CAPITAL LETTER J WITH DOUBLE ACUTE	&Jdblac;
	U+E34B	LATIN CAPITAL LETTER V WITH DOUBLE ACUTE	&Vdblac;
	U+E350	LATIN CAPITAL LETTER W WITH DOUBLE ACUTE	&Wdblac;
	U+E37C	LATIN CAPITAL LETTER Y WITH DOUBLE ACUTE	&Ydblac;
	U+E425	LATIN SMALL LETTER A WITH DOUBLE ACUTE	&adblac;
	U+E441	LATIN SMALL LETTER AE WITH DOUBLE ACUTE	&aeligdblac;
	U+E4D1	LATIN SMALL LETTER E WITH DOUBLE ACUTE	&edblac;
	U+E543	LATIN SMALL LETTER I WITH DOUBLE ACUTE	&idblac;
	U+E562	LATIN SMALL LETTER J WITH DOUBLE ACUTE	&jdblac;
	U+E74B	LATIN SMALL LETTER V WITH DOUBLE ACUTE	&vdblac;
	U+E750	LATIN SMALL LETTER W WITH DOUBLE ACUTE	&wdblac;
	U+E77C	LATIN SMALL LETTER Y WITH DOUBLE ACUTE	&ydblac;
	U+EBC0	LATIN CAPITAL LIGATURE AO WITH DOUBLE ACUTE	&AOligdblac;
	U+EBC1	LATIN SMALL LIGATURE AO WITH DOUBLE ACUTE	&aoligdblac;
	U+EBC2	LATIN CAPITAL LIGATURE AV WITH DOUBLE ACUTE	&AVligdblac;
	U+EBC3	LATIN SMALL LIGATURE AV WITH DOUBLE ACUTE	&avligdblac;
	U+EBC6	LATIN CAPITAL LETTER O WITH STROKE AND DOUBLE ACUTE	&Oslashdblac;
	U+EBC7	LATIN SMALL LETTER O WITH STROKE AND DOUBLE ACUTE	&oslashdblac;
	U+EBC8	LATIN CAPITAL LIGATURE OE WITH DOUBLE ACUTE	&OEligdblac;
	U+EBC9	LATIN SMALL LIGATURE OE WITH DOUBLE ACUTE	&oeligdblac;
	U+EBCA	LATIN CAPITAL LIGATURE YY WITH DOUBLE ACUTE	&YYligdblac;
	U+EBCB	LATIN SMALL LIGATURE YY WITH DOUBLE ACUTE	&yyligdblac;
	U+EFEA	LATIN CAPITAL LIGATURE AA WITH DOUBLE ACUTE	&AAligdblac;
	U+EFEB	LATIN SMALL LIGATURE AA WITH DOUBLE ACUTE	&aaligdblac;
	U+EFEC	LATIN CAPITAL LIGATURE OO WITH DOUBLE ACUTE	&OOligdblac;
	U+EFED	LATIN SMALL LIGATURE OO WITH DOUBLE ACUTE	&ooligdblac;
	U+E268	LATIN CAPITAL LETTER P WITH DOUBLE ACUTE	&Pdblac;
	U+E668	LATIN SMALL LETTER P WITH DOUBLE ACUTE	&pdblac;
	U+EFD9	LATIN CAPITAL LIGATURE UU WITH DOUBLE ACUTE	&UUligdblac;
	U+EFD8	LATIN SMALL LIGATURE UU WITH DOUBLE ACUTE	&uuligdblac;
PUA-18: Dot above
	U+E043	LATIN CAPITAL LETTER AE WITH DOT ABOVE	&AEligdot;
	U+E15C	LATIN CAPITAL LETTER J WITH DOT ABOVE	&Jdot;
	U+E168	LATIN CAPITAL LETTER K WITH DOT ABOVE	&Kdot;
	U+E19E	LATIN CAPITAL LETTER L WITH DOT ABOVE	&Ldot;
	U+E282	LATIN CAPITAL LETTER Q WITH DOT ABOVE	&Qdot;
	U+E315	LATIN CAPITAL LETTER U WITH DOT ABOVE	&Udot;
	U+E34C	LATIN CAPITAL LETTER V WITH DOT ABOVE	&Vdot;
	U+E3E7	LATIN CAPITAL LETTER INSULAR V (VEND) WITH DOT ABOVE	&Vinsdot;
	U+E443	LATIN SMALL LETTER AE WITH DOT ABOVE	&aeligdot;
	U+E568	LATIN SMALL LETTER K WITH DOT ABOVE	&kdot;
	U+E59E	LATIN SMALL LETTER L WITH DOT ABOVE	&ldot;
	U+E682	LATIN SMALL LETTER Q WITH DOT ABOVE	&qdot;
	U+E715	LATIN SMALL LETTER U WITH DOT ABOVE	&udot;
	U+E74C	LATIN SMALL LETTER V WITH DOT ABOVE	&vdot;
	U+E7E7	LATIN SMALL LETTER INSULAR V (VEND) WITH DOT ABOVE	&vinsdot;
	U+EBCD	LATIN CAPITAL LETTER O WITH STROKE AND DOT ABOVE	&Oslashdot;
	U+EBCE	LATIN SMALL LETTER O WITH STROKE AND DOT ABOVE	&oslashdot;
	U+EBCF	LATIN LETTER SMALL CAPITAL P WITH DOT ABOVE	&pscapdot;
	U+EBD0	LATIN LETTER SMALL CAPITAL B WITH DOT ABOVE	&bscapdot;
	U+EBD1	LATIN SMALL LETTER D ROTUNDA WITH DOT ABOVE	&drotdot;
	U+EBD2	LATIN LETTER SMALL CAPITAL D WITH DOT ABOVE	&dscapdot;
	U+EBD3	LATIN CAPITAL LETTER INSULAR F WITH DOT ABOVE	&Finsdot;
	U+EBD4	LATIN SMALL LETTER INSULAR F WITH DOT ABOVE	&finsdot;
	U+EBD5	LATIN SMALL LETTER SEMI-CLOSED INSULAR F WITH DOT ABOVE	&finssemiclosedot;
	U+EBD6	LATIN SMALL LETTER CLOSED INSULAR F WITH DOT ABOVE	&finsclosedot;
	U+EBD7	LATIN LETTER SMALL CAPITAL F WITH DOT ABOVE	&fscapdot;
	U+EBDA	LATIN LETTER SMALL CAPITAL H WITH DOT ABOVE	&hscapdot;
	U+EBDB	LATIN LETTER SMALL CAPITAL K WITH DOT ABOVE	&kscapdot;
	U+EBDC	LATIN LETTER SMALL CAPITAL L WITH DOT ABOVE	&lscapdot;
	U+EBDD	LATIN LETTER SMALL CAPITAL M WITH DOT ABOVE	&mscapdot;
	U+EF20	LATIN LETTER SMALL CAPITAL G WITH DOT ABOVE	&gscapdot;
	U+EF21	LATIN LETTER SMALL CAPITAL N WITH DOT ABOVE	&nscapdot;
	U+EF22	LATIN LETTER SMALL CAPITAL R WITH DOT ABOVE	&rscapdot;
	U+EF23	LATIN LETTER SMALL CAPITAL S WITH DOT ABOVE	&sscapdot;
	U+EF24	LATIN LETTER SMALL CAPITAL T WITH DOT ABOVE	&tscapdot;
	U+EFEE	LATIN CAPITAL LIGATURE AA WITH DOT ABOVE	&AAligdot;
	U+EFEF	LATIN SMALL LIGATURE AA WITH DOT ABOVE	&aaligdot;
	U+EFF0	LATIN CAPITAL LIGATURE AY WITH DOT ABOVE	&AYligdot;
	U+EFF1	LATIN SMALL LIGATURE AY WITH DOT ABOVE	&ayligdot;
PUA-19: Dot below
	U+E036	LATIN CAPITAL LETTER AE WITH DOT BELOW	&AEligdotbl;
	U+E066	LATIN CAPITAL LETTER C WITH DOT BELOW	&Cdotbl;
	U+E08F	LATIN CAPITAL LETTER ETH WITH DOT BELOW	&ETHdotbl;
	U+E0EE	LATIN CAPITAL LETTER F WITH DOT BELOW	&Fdotbl;
	U+E101	LATIN CAPITAL LETTER G WITH DOT BELOW	&Gdotbl;
	U+E151	LATIN CAPITAL LETTER J WITH DOT BELOW	&Jdotbl;
	U+E26D	LATIN CAPITAL LETTER P WITH DOT BELOW	&Pdotbl;
	U+E288	LATIN CAPITAL LETTER Q WITH DOT BELOW	&Qdotbl;
	U+E39F	LATIN CAPITAL LETTER THORN WITH DOT BELOW	&THORNdotbl;
	U+E3E5	LATIN CAPITAL LETTER INSULAR F WITH DOT BELOW	&Finsdotbl;
	U+E3E6	LATIN CAPITAL LETTER INSULAR V (VEND) WITH DOT BELOW	&Vinsdotbl;
	U+E436	LATIN SMALL LETTER AE WITH DOT BELOW	&aeligdotbl;
	U+E466	LATIN SMALL LETTER C WITH DOT BELOW	&cdotbl;
	U+E48F	LATIN SMALL LETTER ETH WITH DOT BELOW	&ethdotbl;
	U+E4EE	LATIN SMALL LETTER F WITH DOT BELOW	&fdotbl;
	U+E501	LATIN SMALL LETTER G WITH DOT BELOW	&gdotbl;
	U+E551	LATIN SMALL LETTER J WITH DOT BELOW	&jdotbl;
	U+E66D	LATIN SMALL LETTER P WITH DOT BELOW	&pdotbl;
	U+E688	LATIN SMALL LETTER Q WITH DOT BELOW	&qdotbl;
	U+E79F	LATIN SMALL LETTER THORN WITH DOT BELOW	&thorndotbl;
	U+E7C1	LATIN SMALL LETTER R ROTUNDA WITH DOT BELOW	&rrotdotbl;
	U+E7C2	LATIN SMALL LETTER LONG S WITH DOT BELOW	&slongdotbl;
	U+E7E5	LATIN SMALL LETTER INSULAR F WITH DOT BELOW	&finsdotbl;
	U+E7E6	LATIN SMALL LETTER INSULAR V (VEND) WITH DOT BELOW	&vinsdotbl;
	U+EBE0	LATIN CAPITAL LETTER O WITH STROKE AND DOT BELOW	&Oslashdotbl;
	U+EBE1	LATIN SMALL LETTER O WITH STROKE AND DOT BELOW	&oslashdotbl;
	U+EF25	LATIN LETTER SMALL CAPITAL B WITH DOT BELOW	&bscapdotbl;
	U+EF26	LATIN LETTER SMALL CAPITAL D WITH DOT BELOW	&dscapdotbl;
	U+EF27	LATIN LETTER SMALL CAPITAL G WITH DOT BELOW	&gscapdotbl;
	U+EF28	LATIN LETTER SMALL CAPITAL L WITH DOT BELOW	&lscapdotbl;
	U+EF29	LATIN LETTER SMALL CAPITAL M WITH DOT BELOW	&mscapdotbl;
	U+EF2A	LATIN LETTER SMALL CAPITAL N WITH DOT BELOW	&nscapdotbl;
	U+EF2B	LATIN LETTER SMALL CAPITAL R WITH DOT BELOW	&rscapdotbl;
	U+EF2C	LATIN LETTER SMALL CAPITAL S WITH DOT BELOW	&sscapdotbl;
	U+EF2D	LATIN LETTER SMALL CAPITAL T WITH DOT BELOW	&tscapdotbl;
	U+EFF2	LATIN CAPITAL LIGATURE AA WITH DOT BELOW	&AAligdotbl;
	U+EFF3	LATIN SMALL LIGATURE AA WITH DOT BELOW	&aaligdotbl;
	U+EFF4	LATIN CAPITAL LIGATURE AO WITH DOT BELOW	&AOligdotbl;
	U+EFF5	LATIN SMALL LIGATURE AO WITH DOT BELOW	&aoligdotbl;
	U+EFF6	LATIN CAPITAL LIGATURE AU WITH DOT BELOW	&AUligdotbl;
	U+EFF7	LATIN SMALL LIGATURE AU WITH DOT BELOW	&auligdotbl;
	U+EFF8	LATIN CAPITAL LIGATURE AV WITH DOT BELOW	&AVligdotbl;
	U+EFF9	LATIN SMALL LIGATURE AV WITH DOT BELOW	&avligdotbl;
	U+EFFA	LATIN CAPITAL LIGATURE AY WITH DOT BELOW	&AYligdotbl;
	U+EFFB	LATIN SMALL LIGATURE AY WITH DOT BELOW	&ayligdotbl;
	U+EFFC	LATIN CAPITAL LIGATURE OO WITH DOT BELOW	&OOligdotbl;
	U+EFFD	LATIN SMALL LIGATURE OO WITH DOT BELOW	&ooligdotbl;
PUA-20: Diaeresis (umlaut, trema)
	U+E042	LATIN CAPITAL LETTER AE WITH DIAERESIS	&AEliguml;
	U+E342	LATIN CAPITAL LETTER V WITH DIAERESIS	&Vuml;
	U+E442	LATIN SMALL LETTER AE WITH DIAERESIS	&aeliguml;
	U+E742	LATIN SMALL LETTER V WITH DIAERESIS	&vuml;
	U+E8D5	LATIN SMALL LETTER A WITH DIAGONAL DIAERESIS	&adiaguml;
	U+E8D7	LATIN SMALL LETTER O WITH DIAGONAL DIAERESIS	&odiaguml;
	U+EBE2	LATIN CAPITAL LETTER J WITH DIAERESIS	&Juml;
	U+EBE3	LATIN SMALL LETTER J WITH DIAERESIS	&juml;
	U+EBE4	LATIN CAPITAL LIGATURE OO WITH DIAERESIS	&OOliguml;
	U+EBE5	LATIN SMALL LIGATURE OO WITH DIAERESIS	&ooliguml;
	U+EBE6	LATIN CAPITAL LIGATURE PP WITH DIAERESIS	&PPliguml;
	U+EBE7	LATIN SMALL LIGATURE PP WITH DIAERESIS	&ppliguml;
	U+EBE8	LATIN CAPITAL LIGATURE YY WITH DIAERESIS	&YYliguml;
	U+EBE9	LATIN SMALL LIGATURE YY WITH DIAERESIS	&yyliguml;
	U+EFFE	LATIN CAPITAL LIGATURE AA WITH DIAERESIS	&AAliguml;
	U+EFFF	LATIN SMALL LIGATURE AA WITH DIAERESIS	&aaliguml;
PUA-21: Curl
	U+E033	LATIN CAPITAL LETTER A WITH CURL	&Acurl;
	U+E0E9	LATIN CAPITAL LETTER E WITH CURL	&Ecurl;
	U+E12A	LATIN CAPITAL LETTER I WITH CURL	&Icurl;
	U+E163	LATIN CAPITAL LETTER J WITH CURL	&Jcurl;
	U+E331	LATIN CAPITAL LETTER U WITH CURL	&Ucurl;
	U+E385	LATIN CAPITAL LETTER Y WITH CURL	&Ycurl;
	U+E3D3	LATIN CAPITAL LETTER O WITH CURL	&Ocurl;
	U+E3D4	LATIN CAPITAL LETTER O WITH STROKE AND CURL	&Oslashcurl;
	U+E433	LATIN SMALL LETTER A WITH CURL	&acurl;
	U+E4E9	LATIN SMALL LETTER E WITH CURL	&ecurl;
	U+E52A	LATIN SMALL LETTER I WITH CURL	&icurl;
	U+E563	LATIN SMALL LETTER J WITH CURL	&jcurl;
	U+E731	LATIN SMALL LETTER U WITH CURL	&ucurl;
	U+E785	LATIN SMALL LETTER Y WITH CURL	&ycurl;
	U+E7D3	LATIN SMALL LETTER O WITH CURL	&ocurl;
	U+E7D4	LATIN SMALL LETTER O WITH STROKE AND CURL	&oslashcurl;
	U+EBEA	LATIN CAPITAL LETTER AE WITH CURL	&AEligcurl;
	U+EBEB	LATIN SMALL LETTER AE WITH CURL	&aeligcurl;
PUA-22: Ogonek
	U+E040	LATIN CAPITAL LETTER AE WITH OGONEK	&AEligogon;
	U+E076	LATIN CAPITAL LETTER C WITH OGONEK	&Cogon;
	U+E255	LATIN CAPITAL LETTER O WITH STROKE AND OGONEK	&Oslashogon;
	U+E2EE	LATIN CAPITAL LETTER T WITH OGONEK	&Togon;
	U+E440	LATIN SMALL LETTER AE WITH OGONEK	&aeligogon;
	U+E476	LATIN SMALL LETTER C WITH OGONEK	&cogon;
	U+E655	LATIN SMALL LETTER O WITH STROKE AND OGONEK	&oslashogon;
	U+E6EE	LATIN SMALL LETTER T WITH OGONEK	&togon;
	U+EBF0	LATIN CAPITAL LIGATURE AV WITH OGONEK	&AVligogon;
	U+EBF1	LATIN SMALL LIGATURE AV WITH OGONEK	&avligogon;
	U+E262	LATIN CAPITAL LIGATURE OE WITH OGONEK	&OEligogon;
	U+E662	LATIN SMALL LIGATURE OE WITH OGONEK	&oeligogon;
	U+E8DD	LATIN SMALL LETTER DOTLESS I WITH OGONEK	&inodotogon;
PUA-23: Breve
	U+E03F	LATIN CAPITAL LETTER AE WITH BREVE	&AEligbreve;
	U+E376	LATIN CAPITAL LETTER Y WITH BREVE	&Ybreve;
	U+E43F	LATIN SMALL LETTER AE WITH BREVE	&aeligbreve;
	U+E776	LATIN SMALL LETTER Y WITH BREVE	&ybreve;
	U+EBEE	LATIN CAPITAL LETTER O WITH STROKE AND BREVE	&Oslashbreve;
	U+EBEF	LATIN SMALL LETTER O WITH STROKE AND BREVE	&oslashbreve;
PUA-24: Breve below
	U+E548	LATIN SMALL LETTER I WITH INVERTED BREVE BELOW	&ibrevinvbl;
	U+E727	LATIN SMALL LETTER U WITH INVERTED BREVE BELOW	&ubrevinvbl;
PUA-25: Circumflex
	U+E33B	LATIN CAPITAL LETTER V WITH CIRCUMFLEX	&Vcirc;
	U+E5D7	LATIN SMALL LETTER N WITH CIRCUMFLEX	&ncirc;
	U+E73B	LATIN SMALL LETTER V WITH CIRCUMFLEX	&vcirc;
	U+EBBD	LATIN SMALL LETTER EA WITH CIRCUMFLEX	&eacombcirc;
	U+EBBE	LATIN SMALL LETTER EU WITH CIRCUMFLEX	&eucombcirc;
PUA-26: Ring above
	U+E4CF	LATIN SMALL LETTER E WITH RING ABOVE	&ering;
	U+E637	LATIN SMALL LETTER O WITH RING ABOVE	&oring;
	U+E743	LATIN SMALL LETTER V WITH RING ABOVE	&vring;
	U+E8D1	LATIN SMALL LETTER AE WITH RING ABOVE	&aeligring;
PUA-27: Ring below
	U+E5A4	LATIN SMALL LETTER L WITH RING BELOW	&lringbl;
	U+E5C5	LATIN SMALL LETTER M WITH RING BELOW	&mringbl;
	U+E5EE	LATIN SMALL LETTER N WITH RING BELOW	&nringbl;
	U+E6A3	LATIN SMALL LETTER R WITH RING BELOW	&rringbl;
PUA-28: Stroke
	U+E68B	LATIN SMALL LETTER Q WITH STROKE THROUGH DESCENDER AND TILDE	&qbardestilde;
PUA-29: Curly bar
	U+EBBF	LATIN SMALL LETTER U WITH CURLY BAR ABOVE	&ucurlbar;
PUA-30: Vertical line above
	U+E324	LATIN CAPITAL LETTER U WITH VERTICAL LINE ABOVE	&Uvertline;
	U+E724	LATIN SMALL LETTER U WITH VERTICAL LINE ABOVE	&uvertline;
	U+E34E	LATIN CAPITAL LETTER V WITH VERTICAL LINE ABOVE	&Vvertline;
	U+E74F	LATIN SMALL LETTER V WITH VERTICAL LINE ABOVE	&vvertline;
PUA-31: Superscript letters
	U+E02C	LATIN CAPITAL LETTER A WITH LATIN SMALL LETTER E ABOVE	&Aesup;
	U+E0E1	LATIN CAPITAL LETTER E WITH LATIN SMALL LETTER A ABOVE	&Easup;
	U+E244	LATIN CAPITAL LETTER O WITH LATIN SMALL LETTER E ABOVE	&Oesup;
	U+E246	LATIN CAPITAL LETTER O WITH LATIN SMALL LETTER U ABOVE	&Ousup;
	U+E32B	LATIN CAPITAL LETTER U WITH LATIN SMALL LETTER E ABOVE	&Uesup;
	U+E32D	LATIN CAPITAL LETTER U WITH LATIN SMALL LETTER O ABOVE	&Uosup;
	U+E353	LATIN CAPITAL LETTER W WITH LATIN SMALL LETTER E ABOVE	&Wesup;
	U+E42C	LATIN SMALL LETTER A WITH LATIN SMALL LETTER E ABOVE	&aesup;
	U+E42D	LATIN SMALL LETTER A WITH LATIN SMALL LETTER O ABOVE	&aosup;
	U+E42E	LATIN SMALL LETTER A WITH LATIN SMALL LETTER V ABOVE	&avsup;
	U+E4E1	LATIN SMALL LETTER E WITH LATIN SMALL LETTER A ABOVE	&easup;
	U+E4E2	LATIN SMALL LETTER E WITH LATIN SMALL LETTER I ABOVE	&eisup;
	U+E4E3	LATIN SMALL LETTER E WITH LATIN SMALL LETTER V ABOVE	&evsup;
	U+E54A	LATIN SMALL LETTER I WITH LATIN SMALL LETTER E ABOVE	&iesup;
	U+E54B	LATIN SMALL LETTER I WITH LATIN SMALL LETTER V ABOVE	&ivsup;
	U+E643	LATIN SMALL LETTER O WITH LATIN SMALL LETTER A ABOVE	&oasup;
	U+E644	LATIN SMALL LETTER O WITH LATIN SMALL LETTER E ABOVE	&oesup;
	U+E645	LATIN SMALL LETTER O WITH LATIN SMALL LETTER I ABOVE	&oisup;
	U+E646	LATIN SMALL LETTER O WITH LATIN SMALL LETTER U ABOVE	&ousup;
	U+E647	LATIN SMALL LETTER O WITH LATIN SMALL LETTER V ABOVE	&ovsup;
	U+E72B	LATIN SMALL LETTER U WITH LATIN SMALL LETTER E ABOVE	&uesup;
	U+E72C	LATIN SMALL LETTER U WITH LATIN SMALL LETTER I ABOVE	&uisup;
	U+E72D	LATIN SMALL LETTER U WITH LATIN SMALL LETTER O ABOVE	&uosup;
	U+E753	LATIN SMALL LETTER W WITH LATIN SMALL LETTER E ABOVE	&wesup;
	U+E754	LATIN SMALL LETTER W WITH LATIN SMALL LETTER O ABOVE	&wosup;
	U+E781	LATIN SMALL LETTER Y WITH LATIN SMALL LETTER E ABOVE	&yesup;
	U+E8E0	LATIN SMALL LETTER A WITH LATIN SMALL LETTER I ABOVE	&iesup;
	U+E8E1	LATIN SMALL LETTER A WITH LATIN SMALL LETTER U ABOVE	&ausup;
	U+E8E2	LATIN SMALL LETTER E WITH LATIN SMALL LETTER E ABOVE	&eesup;
	U+E8E3	LATIN SMALL LETTER E WITH LATIN SMALL LETTER O ABOVE	&eosup;
	U+E8E4	LATIN SMALL LETTER I WITH LATIN SMALL LETTER A ABOVE	&iasup;
	U+E8E5	LATIN SMALL LETTER I WITH LATIN SMALL LETTER O ABOVE	&iosup;
	U+E8E6	LATIN SMALL LETTER I WITH LATIN SMALL LETTER U ABOVE	&iusup;
	U+E8E7	LATIN SMALL LETTER J WITH LATIN SMALL LETTER E ABOVE	&jesup;
	U+E8E8	LATIN SMALL LETTER M WITH LATIN SMALL LETTER E ABOVE	&mesup;
	U+E8E9	LATIN SMALL LETTER O WITH LATIN SMALL LETTER O ABOVE	&oosup;
	U+E8EA	LATIN SMALL LETTER R WITH LATIN SMALL LETTER E ABOVE	&resup;
	U+E8EB	LATIN SMALL LETTER U WITH LATIN SMALL LETTER A ABOVE	&uasup;
	U+E8EC	LATIN SMALL LETTER U WITH LATIN SMALL LETTER V ABOVE	&uvsup;
	U+E8ED	LATIN SMALL LETTER U WITH LATIN SMALL LETTER W ABOVE	&uwsup;
	U+E8F0	LATIN SMALL LETTER W WITH LATIN SMALL LETTER A ABOVE	&wasup;
	U+E8F1	LATIN SMALL LETTER W WITH LATIN SMALL LETTER I ABOVE	&wisup;
	U+E8F2	LATIN SMALL LETTER W WITH LATIN SMALL LETTER U ABOVE	&wusup;
	U+E8F3	LATIN SMALL LETTER W WITH LATIN SMALL LETTER V ABOVE	&wvsup;
PUA-32: Dot above and acute
	U+E0C8	LATIN CAPITAL LETTER E WITH DOT ABOVE AND ACUTE	&Edotacute;
	U+E384	LATIN CAPITAL LETTER Y WITH DOT ABOVE AND ACUTE	&Ydotacute;
	U+E4C8	LATIN SMALL LETTER E WITH DOT ABOVE AND ACUTE	&edotacute;
	U+E784	LATIN SMALL LETTER Y WITH DOT ABOVE AND ACUTE	&ydotacute;
	U+EBF4	LATIN CAPITAL LETTER A WITH DOT ABOVE AND ACUTE	&Adotacute;
	U+EBF5	LATIN SMALL LETTER A WITH DOT ABOVE AND ACUTE	&adotacute;
	U+EBF6	LATIN CAPITAL LETTER I WITH DOT ABOVE AND ACUTE	&Idotacute;
	U+EBF7	LATIN SMALL LETTER I WITH DOT ABOVE AND ACUTE	&idotacute;
	U+EBF8	LATIN CAPITAL LETTER O WITH DOT ABOVE AND ACUTE	&Odotacute;
	U+EBF9	LATIN SMALL LETTER O WITH DOT ABOVE AND ACUTE	&odotacute;
	U+EBFC	LATIN CAPITAL LETTER O WITH STROKE AND DOT ABOVE AND ACUTE	&Oslashdotacute;
	U+EBFD	LATIN SMALL LETTER O WITH STROKE AND DOT ABOVE AND ACUTE	&oslashdotacute;
	U+EBFE	LATIN CAPITAL LETTER U WITH DOT ABOVE AND ACUTE	&Udotacute;
	U+EBFF	LATIN SMALL LETTER U WITH DOT ABOVE AND ACUTE	&udotacute;
	U+EFDB	LATIN CAPITAL LETTER AE WITH DOT ABOVE AND ACUTE	&AEligdotacute;
	U+EFDC	LATIN SMALL LETTER AE WITH DOT ABOVE AND ACUTE	&aeligdotacute;
PUA-33: Dot below and acute
	U+E498	LATIN SMALL LETTER E WITH DOT BELOW AND ACUTE	&edotblacute;
PUA-34: Diaeresis and acute
	U+E62C	LATIN SMALL LETTER O WITH DIAERESIS AND ACUTE	&oumlacute;
PUA-35: Curl and acute
	U+EBB7	LATIN CAPITAL LETTER O WITH CURL AND ACUTE	&Ocurlacute;
	U+EBB8	LATIN SMALL LETTER O WITH CURL AND ACUTE	&ocurlacute;
PUA-36: Ogonek and acute
	U+E004	LATIN CAPITAL LETTER A WITH OGONEK AND ACUTE	&Aogonacute;
	U+E099	LATIN CAPITAL LETTER E WITH OGONEK AND ACUTE	&Eogonacute;
	U+E20C	LATIN CAPITAL LETTER O WITH OGONEK AND ACUTE	&Oogonacute;
	U+E257	LATIN CAPITAL LETTER O WITH STROKE AND OGONEK AND ACUTE	&Oslashogonacute;
	U+E404	LATIN SMALL LETTER A WITH OGONEK AND ACUTE	&aogonacute;
	U+E499	LATIN SMALL LETTER E WITH OGONEK AND ACUTE	&eogonacute;
	U+E60C	LATIN SMALL LETTER O WITH OGONEK AND ACUTE	&oogonacute;
	U+E657	LATIN SMALL LETTER O WITH STROKE AND OGONEK AND ACUTE	&oslashogonacute;
	U+E8D3	LATIN SMALL LETTER AE WITH OGONEK AND ACUTE	&aeligogonacute;
PUA-37: Ogonek and double acute
	U+E0EA	LATIN CAPITAL LETTER E WITH OGONEK AND DOUBLE ACUTE	&Eogondblac;
	U+E4EA	LATIN SMALL LETTER E WITH OGONEK AND DOUBLE ACUTE	&eogondblac;
	U+EBC4	LATIN CAPITAL LETTER O WITH OGONEK AND DOUBLE ACUTE	&Oogondblac;
	U+EBC5	LATIN SMALL LETTER O WITH OGONEK AND DOUBLE ACUTE	&oogondblac;
PUA-38: Ogonek and dot above
	U+E0EB	LATIN CAPITAL LETTER E WITH OGONEK AND DOT ABOVE	&Eogondot;
	U+E4EB	LATIN SMALL LETTER E WITH OGONEK AND DOT ABOVE	&eogondot;
	U+EBDE	LATIN CAPITAL LETTER O WITH OGONEK AND DOT ABOVE	&Oogondot;
	U+EBDF	LATIN SMALL LETTER O WITH OGONEK AND DOT ABOVE	&oogondot;
PUA-39: Ogonek and dot below
	U+E0E8	LATIN CAPITAL LETTER E WITH OGONEK AND DOT BELOW	&Eogondotbl;
	U+E208	LATIN CAPITAL LETTER O WITH OGONEK AND DOT BELOW	&Oogondotbl;
	U+E4E8	LATIN SMALL LETTER E WITH OGONEK AND DOT BELOW	&eogondotbl;
	U+E608	LATIN SMALL LETTER O WITH OGONEK AND DOT BELOW	&oogondotbl;
PUA-40: Diaeresis and macron
	U+E4CD	LATIN SMALL LETTER E WITH DIAERESIS AND MACRON	&eumlmacr;
PUA-41: Diaeresis and circumflex
	U+E22D	LATIN CAPITAL LETTER O WITH DIAERESIS AND CIRCUMFLEX	&Oumlcirc;
	U+E317	LATIN CAPITAL LETTER U WITH DIAERESIS AND CIRCUMFLEX	&Uumlcirc;
	U+E41A	LATIN SMALL LETTER A WITH DIAERESIS AND CIRCUMFLEX	&aumlcirc;
	U+E62D	LATIN SMALL LETTER O WITH DIAERESIS AND CIRCUMFLEX	&oumlcirc;
	U+E717	LATIN SMALL LETTER U WITH DIAERESIS AND CIRCUMFLEX	&uumlcirc;
PUA-42: Diaeresis and dot below
	U+E41D	LATIN SMALL LETTER A WITH DIAERESIS AND DOT BELOW	&adotbluml;
PUA-43: Ogonek and curl
	U+E24F	LATIN CAPITAL LETTER O WITH OGONEK AND CURL	&Oogoncurl;
	U+E64F	LATIN SMALL LETTER O WITH OGONEK AND CURL	&oogoncurl;
	U+EBF2	LATIN CAPITAL LETTER E WITH OGONEK AND CURL	&Eogoncurl;
	U+EBF3	LATIN SMALL LETTER E WITH OGONEK AND CURL	&eogoncurl;
PUA-44: Ogonek and circumflex
	U+E49F	LATIN SMALL LETTER E WITH OGONEK AND CIRCUMFLEX	&eogoncirc;
	U+E60E	LATIN SMALL LETTER O WITH OGONEK AND CIRCUMFLEX	&oogoncirc;
PUA-45: Ring and circumflex
	U+E41F	LATIN SMALL LETTER A WITH RING ABOVE AND CIRCUMFLEX	&aringcirc;
PUA-46: Macron and breve
	U+E010	LATIN CAPITAL LETTER A WITH MACRON AND BREVE	&Amacrbreve;
	U+E03D	LATIN CAPITAL LETTER AE WITH MACRON AND BREVE	&AEligmacrbreve;
	U+E0B7	LATIN CAPITAL LETTER E WITH MACRON AND BREVE	&Emacrbreve;
	U+E137	LATIN CAPITAL LETTER I WITH MACRON AND BREVE	&Imacrbreve;
	U+E21B	LATIN CAPITAL LETTER O WITH MACRON AND BREVE	&Omacrbreve;
	U+E253	LATIN CAPITAL LETTER O WITH STROKE AND MACRON AND BREVE	&Oslashmacrbreve;
	U+E260	LATIN CAPITAL LIGATURE OE WITH MACRON AND BREVE	&OEligmacrbreve;
	U+E30B	LATIN CAPITAL LETTER U WITH MACRON AND BREVE	&Umacrbreve;
	U+E375	LATIN CAPITAL LETTER Y WITH MACRON AND BREVE	&Ymacrbreve;
	U+E410	LATIN SMALL LETTER A WITH MACRON AND BREVE	&amacrbreve;
	U+E43D	LATIN SMALL LETTER AE WITH MACRON AND BREVE	&aeligmacrbreve;
	U+E4B7	LATIN SMALL LETTER E WITH MACRON AND BREVE	&emacrbreve;
	U+E537	LATIN SMALL LETTER I WITH MACRON AND BREVE	&imacrbreve;
	U+E61B	LATIN SMALL LETTER O WITH MACRON AND BREVE	&omacrbreve;
	U+E653	LATIN SMALL LETTER O WITH STROKE AND MACRON AND BREVE	&oslashmacrbreve;
	U+E660	LATIN SMALL LIGATURE OE WITH MACRON AND BREVE	&oeligmacrbreve;
	U+E70B	LATIN SMALL LETTER U WITH MACRON AND BREVE	&umacrbreve;
	U+E775	LATIN SMALL LETTER Y WITH MACRON AND BREVE	&ymacrbreve;
PUA-47: Macron and acute
	U+E00A	LATIN CAPITAL LETTER A WITH MACRON AND ACUTE	&Amacracute;
	U+E03A	LATIN CAPITAL LETTER AE WITH MACRON AND ACUTE	&AEligmacracute;
	U+E135	LATIN CAPITAL LETTER I WITH MACRON AND ACUTE	&Imacracute;
	U+E309	LATIN CAPITAL LETTER U WITH MACRON AND ACUTE	&Umacracute;
	U+E373	LATIN CAPITAL LETTER Y WITH MACRON AND ACUTE	&Ymacracute;
	U+E40A	LATIN SMALL LETTER A WITH MACRON AND ACUTE	&amacracute;
	U+E43A	LATIN SMALL LETTER AE WITH MACRON AND ACUTE	&aeligmacracute;
	U+E535	LATIN SMALL LETTER I WITH MACRON AND ACUTE	&imacracute;
	U+E709	LATIN SMALL LETTER U WITH MACRON AND ACUTE	&umacracute;
	U+E773	LATIN SMALL LETTER Y WITH MACRON AND ACUTE	&ymacracute;
	U+EBEC	LATIN CAPITAL LETTER O WITH STROKE AND MACRON AND ACUTE	&Oslashmacracute;
	U+EBED	LATIN SMALL LETTER O WITH STROKE AND MACRON AND ACUTE	&oslashmacracute;
PUA-48: Ogonek, dot above and acute
	U+E0EC	LATIN CAPITAL LETTER E WITH OGONEK AND DOT ABOVE AND ACUTE	&Eogondotacute;
	U+E4EC	LATIN SMALL LETTER E WITH OGONEK AND DOT ABOVE AND ACUTE	&eogondotacute;
	U+EBFA	LATIN CAPITAL LETTER O WITH OGONEK AND DOT ABOVE AND ACUTE	&Oogondotacute;
	U+EBFB	LATIN SMALL LETTER O WITH OGONEK AND DOT ABOVE AND ACUTE	&oogondotacute;

MUFI assignments in the Private Use Area: Category 3 – Variant letter forms
Char	Position	Descriptive name	Entity
PUA-51: Letter forms
	U+EEC6	LATIN SMALL LIGATURE DD ROTUNDA	&drotdrotlig;
	U+F106	LATIN CAPITAL LETTER C SQUARE FORM	&Csqu;
	U+F10A	LATIN CAPITAL LETTER E UNCIAL FORM	&Eunc;
	U+F10E	LATIN CAPITAL LETTER G SQUARE FORM	&Gsqu;
	U+F110	LATIN CAPITAL LETTER UNCIAL H	&Hunc;
	U+F11A	LATIN CAPITAL LETTER UNCIAL M	&Munc;
	U+F126	LATIN CAPITAL LETTER S CLOSED FORM	&Sclose;
	U+F127	LATIN SMALL LETTER LONG S DESCENDING	&slongdes;
	U+F128	LATIN SMALL LETTER S CLOSED FORM	&sclose;
	U+F13A	LATIN CAPITAL LETTER A SQUARE FORM	&Asqu;
	U+F193	LATIN SMALL LETTER D WITH CURL	&dcurl;
	U+F194	LATIN SMALL LETTER F WITH CURL	&fcurl;
	U+F195	LATIN SMALL LETTER K WITH CURL	&kcurl;
	U+F196	LATIN SMALL LETTER G WITH CURL	&gcurl;
	U+F198	LATIN SMALL LETTER C WITH CURL	&ccurl;
	U+F199	LATIN SMALL LETTER T WITH CURL	&tcurl;
	U+F19A	LATIN SMALL LETTER N WITH FLOURISH	&nflour;
	U+F19B	LATIN SMALL LETTER R WITH FLOURISH	&rflour;
	U+F200	LATIN SMALL LETTER A INSULAR FORM	&ains;
	U+F201	LATIN CAPITAL LETTER A INSULAR FORM	&Ains;
	U+F202	LATIN SMALL LETTER OPEN A CAROLINGIAN FORM	&aopen;
	U+F203	LATIN SMALL LETTER CLOSED A GOTHIC FORM	&aclose;
	U+F204	LATIN SMALL LETTER AE WITH RIGHT UPPER LOOP	&aeligred;
	U+F207	LATIN SMALL LETTER CLOSED INSULAR F	&finsclose;
	U+F208	LATIN LETTER UNCIAL K	&kunc;
	U+F209	LATIN SMALL LETTER K CLOSED FORM	&kclose;
	U+F214	LATIN SMALL LETTER A UNCIAL FORM	&aunc;
	U+F215	LATIN SMALL LETTER NECKLESS A	&aneckless;
	U+F217	LATIN CAPITAL LETTER CLOSED E UNCIAL FORM	&Euncclose;
	U+F218	LATIN SMALL LETTER E UNCIAL FORM	&eunc;
	U+F219	LATIN SMALL LETTER E EXTENDED BAR FORM	&eext;
	U+F21A	LATIN SMALL LETTER E TALL FORM	&etall;
	U+F21B	LATIN SMALL LETTER SEMI-CLOSED INSULAR F	&finssemiclose;
	U+F21C	LATIN SMALL LETTER INSULAR F WITH DOTTED HOOKS	&finsdothook;
	U+F21D	LATIN SMALL LETTER G WITH SEPARATE LOOPS	&gdivloop;
	U+F21E	LATIN SMALL LETTER CLOSED G WITH LARGE LOWER LOOP	&glglowloop;
	U+F21F	LATIN SMALL LETTER CLOSED G WITH SMALL LOWER LOOP	&gsmlowloop;
	U+F220	LATIN SMALL LETTER LONG I	&ilong;
	U+F221	LATIN SMALL LETTER K SEMI-CLOSED FORM	&ksemiclose;
	U+F222	LATIN SMALL LETTER L DESCENDING	&ldes;
	U+F223	LATIN SMALL LETTER M WITH RIGHT DESCENDER	&mrdes;
	U+F224	LATIN CAPITAL LETTER UNCIAL M WITH RIGHT DESCENDER	&Muncdes;
	U+F225	LATIN SMALL LETTER UNCIAL M	&munc;
	U+F226	LATIN SMALL LETTER UNCIAL M WITH RIGHT DESCENDER	&muncdes;
	U+F228	LATIN SMALL LETTER N WITH RIGHT DESCENDER	&nrdes;
	U+F229	LATIN CAPITAL LETTER N WITH RIGHT DESCENDER	&Nrdes;
	U+F22A	LATIN LETTER SMALL CAPITAL N WITH RIGHT DESCENDER	&nscaprdes;
	U+F22B	LATIN LETTER SMALL CAPITAL N WITH LEFT DESCENDER	&nscapldes;
	U+F22C	LATIN CAPITAL LETTER Q WITH STEM	&Qstem;
	U+F233	LATIN SMALL LETTER Y WITH RIGHT MAIN STROKE	&yrgmainstrok;
	U+F23A	LATIN SMALL LETTER H WITH RIGHT DESCENDER	&hrdes;
	U+F23C	LATIN SMALL LETTER M UNCIAL FORM	&munc;
	U+F23D	LATIN SMALL LETTER M UNCIAL FORM WITH RIGHT DESCENDER	&muncdes;

== Coordination ==
Similar initiatives have been founded for Early Cyrillic Symbols (Cyrillic Font Initiative, CYFI) and others. They are coordinated in the Linguistic Corporate Use Area (LINCUA).

UNZ is a set of glyphs used in German blackletter fonts, their typographic ligatures in particular, compatible with MUFI. Additionally, it provides some glyph variants needed for the representation of some historic German handwriting styles, using the PUA code points F4F7…F4F8 and F500…F517.

LINCUA map of the BMP-PUA
U+	__0_	__1_	__2_	__3_	__4_	__5_	__6_	__7_	__8_	__9_	__A_	__B_	__C_	__D_	__E_	__F_
E0__	TITUS Latin capitals															
E1__	TITUS Latin capitals															
E2__	TITUS Latin capitals															
E3__	TITUS Latin capitals															
E4__	TITUS Latin lowercase															
E5__	TITUS Latin lowercase															
E6__	TITUS Latin lowercase															
E7__	TITUS Latin lowercase															
E8__	TITUS Arabic										MUFI medieval Latin					
E9__	TITUS Devanagari															
EA__	TITUS Greek capitals										MUFI Extension A					
EB__	TITUS Greek lowercase										MUFI Extension B					
EC__	TITUS Georgian															
ED__	TITUS Extension A															
EE__	TITUS Extension A								TITUS Cyrillic				MUFI Ligatures A		MUFI Enlarged minuscules	
EF__	TITUS Extension B						CYFI Cyrillic A				MUFI Ligatures B	TITUS-MUFI Misc.			MUFI accented ligatures	
F0__	Combining diacritics															
F1__	MUFI Extension C															
F2__	MUFI Extension C				DCR Dania										MUFI Abbreviations	
F3__	MUFI Runes			CYFI Cyrillic B												
F4__																MUFI Ligatures C
F5__																
F6__																
F7__	MUFI Metrical characters											MUFI Extension D				
F8__	SIAS Musical notation															

== See also ==
- ConScript Unicode Registry
- Record type, a historic family of typefaces designed to allow the special characters of medieval manuscripts to be replicated in print
- Unicode fonts
