= Unicode font =

Computer font that maps glyphs to code points defined in the Unicode Standard

A Unicode font is a computer font that maps glyphs to code points defined in the Unicode Standard. The term has become archaic because the vast majority of modern computer fonts use Unicode mappings, even those fonts which only include glyphs for a single writing system, or even only support the basic Latin alphabet. The distinction is historic: before Unicode, when most computer systems used only eight-bit bytes, no more than 256 characters (or control codes) could be encoded. This meant that each character repertoire had to have its own codepoint assignments – and thus a given codepoint could have multiple meanings. By assuring unique assignments, Unicode resolved this issue.

Fonts which support a wide range of Unicode scripts and Unicode symbols are sometimes referred to as "pan-Unicode fonts", although as the maximum number of glyphs that can be defined in a TrueType font is restricted to 65,535, it is not possible for a single TrueType font to provide individual glyphs for all defined Unicode characters (172,808 characters, with Unicode 18.0). This article lists some widely used Unicode fonts (those shipped with an operating system or produced by a well-known commercial font company) that support a comparatively large number and broad range of Unicode characters.

== Background ==
The Unicode standard does not specify or create any font (typeface), a collection of graphical shapes called glyphs, itself. Rather, it defines the abstract characters as a specific number (known as a code point) and also defines the required changes of shape depending on the context the glyph is used in (e.g., combining characters, precomposed characters and letter-diacritic combinations). The choice of font, which governs how the abstract characters in the Universal Coded Character Set (UCS) are converted into a bitmap or vector output that can then be viewed on a screen or printed, is left up to the user. If a font is chosen which does not contain a glyph for a code point used in the document, it typically displays a question mark, a box, or some other substitute character.

Computer fonts use various techniques to display characters or glyphs. A bitmap font contains a grid of dots known as pixels forming an image of each glyph in each face and size. Outline fonts (also known as vector fonts) use drawing instructions or mathematical formulae to describe each glyph. Stroke fonts use a series of specified lines (for the glyph's border) and additional information to define the profile, or size and shape of the line in a specific face and size, which together describe the appearance of the glyph.

Fonts also include embedded special orthographic rules to output certain combinations of letterforms (and alternative symbols for the same letter) be combined into special ligature forms (mixed characters). Operating systems, web browsers (user agent), and other software that extensively use typography, use a font to display text on the screen or print media, and can be programmed to use those embedded rules. Alternatively, they may use external script-shaping technologies (rendering technology or “smart font” engine), and they can also be programmed to use either a large Unicode font, or use multiple different fonts for different characters or languages.

No single "Unicode font" includes all the characters defined in the present revision of ISO 10646 (Unicode) standard, as more and more languages and characters are continually added to it, and common font formats cannot contain more than 65,535 glyphs (about half the number of characters encoded in Unicode). As a result, font developers and foundries incorporate new characters in newer versions or revisions of a font, or in separate auxiliary fonts intended specifically for particular languages.

UCS has over 1.1 million code points, but only the first 65,536 (the Plane 0: Basic Multilingual Plane, or BMP) had entered into common use before 2000.

See the Unicode planes article for more information on other planes, including: Plane 1: Supplementary Multilingual Plane (SMP), Plane 2: Supplementary Ideographic Plane (SIP), Plane 14: Supplementary Special-purpose Plane (SSP), Plane 15 and 16: reserved for Private Use Areas (PUA).

The first Unicode fonts (with very large character sets and supporting many Unicode blocks) were Lucida Sans Unicode (released March 1993), Unihan font (1993), and Everson Mono (1995).

== Issues ==
There are typographical ambiguities in Unicode, so that some of the unified Han characters (seen in Chinese, Japanese, and Korean) will be typographically different in different regions. For example, Unicode point U+9AA8 骨 CJK UNIFIED IDEOGRAPH-9AA8 is typographically different between simplified Chinese and traditional Chinese. This has implications for the idea that a single typeface can satisfy the needs of all locales. The design of Unicode ensures that such differences do not create semantic ambiguity, but the use of incorrect forms is often considered visually awkward or aesthetically inappropriate to native readers of East Asian languages.

== Application of Unicode fonts ==
Unicode is now the standard encoding for many new standards and protocols, and is built into the architecture of operating systems (Microsoft Windows, Apple Mac OS, and many versions of Unix and Linux), programming languages (Ada, Perl, Python, Java, Common LISP, APL), and libraries (IBM International Components for Unicode (ICU), along with the Pango, Graphite, Scribe, Uniscribe, and ATSUI rendering engines), font formats (TrueType and OpenType) and so on. Many other standards are also getting upgraded to be Unicode-compliant.

== Utility software ==
Here is a selection of some of the utility software that can identify the characters present in a font file:

- Character Map, applet included with Microsoft Windows
- Font Book, application included with Mac OS
- GNOME Character Map, application included with the GNOME desktop environment
- BabelMap, third-party software for Windows

== List of Unicode fonts ==
Of the many Unicode fonts available, those listed below are the most commonly used worldwide on mainstream computing platforms.

List of Unicode Fonts
Font	Chars	Glyphs	Kernpairs (standard)^{‡}	Point (range) : hinting/smoothing behavior	Version & date	Filename, size	Font family	Font weight, style	Font type	Serif style	License	Creator / author (copyright)	Notes
Arial	3,988	3,988	909	0~6: Smoothed. 7~13: Hinted. 14+: Hinted & Smoothed.	v6.80 2012-05-11	arial.ttf (756 KB)	Arial	Medium (Normal), Regular	OTF+TTO^{†}	Normal Sans	Proprietary	(2008) Monotype Corporation	Included with Microsoft Windows
Arial Unicode MS	38,917	50,377	0	0~6: Smoothed. 7~18: Hinted. 19+: Hinted & Smoothed.	v1.01 sfnt rev 1; 2002-11-18	ARIALUNI.TTF (22.1 MB)	Arial Unicode MS	Medium (Normal), Regular	OTF+TTO^{†}	Normal Sans	Proprietary	Agfa Monotype Corporation. Monotype Corporation.	Included with Microsoft Office 2013 and earlier versions
Bitstream Cyberbit	32,961	29,934	935	0~6: Smoothed. 7~13: Hinted. 14+: Hinted & Smoothed.	v2.0 beta 1998-03-22	Cyberbit.ttf (12.7 MB)	Bitstream Cyberbit	Medium (Normal), Roman	TTF	Cove	Freeware	Bitstream Inc.	For non-commercial use only.
BitstreamCyberCJK	30,275	28,686	935	0~6: Smoothed. 7~13: Hinted. 14+: Hinted & Smoothed.	v2.0 beta 1998-03-17	Cyberbit.ttf (12.4 MB)	Bitstream CyberCJK	Medium (Normal), Book, Roman	TTF	Cove	Freeware	Bitstream Inc.	For non-commercial use only.
Brampton	1,916	1,979	0^{‡}		v0.16 2011-09-22	Brampton.ttf (622 kB)	Brampton		TTF	Slab serif	OFL	Christ Trek fonts	
Cardo	2,879	2,882	216	0~6: Smoothed. 7~12: Hinted. 13+: Hinted & Smoothed.	v0.099 sfnt rev 0.098999; 2010-05-23	Cardo99s.ttf (706 KB)	Cardo	Medium (Normal), Book, Regular	TTF	Cove	OFL v1.1	David J. Perry	More Info.
Caslon Roman	3,683	3,686	0	—N/a	v001.000 2003-10-23	CaslonRoman.sfd (3.70 MB)	Caslon	Roman	TTF		BSD-like license	George Williams	
Charis SIL	2,172	4,661	0	0~6: Smoothed. 7~13: Hinted. 14+: Hinted & Smoothed.	v4.106 sfnt rev 4.106; 2009-03-18	CharisSILR.ttf (1.57 MB)	Charis SIL	Medium (Normal), Regular	TTF	Any	OFL	SIL International	
Chryſanþi Unicode (Chrysanthi Unicode)	4,818	4,383	0	0+: Hinted & Smoothed.	v3.1 2001-07-15	chrysuni.ttf (737 KB)	Chrysanthi Unicode	Medium (Normal), Regular	TTF	Any	Freeware	Dolgthrasir Mioethdrauci. Every Witch Way.	Commercial use must be first approved by author.
ClearlyU		9,538 (8388 +1150)	0	—N/a	v1.9 2002-11-22	cu12.bdf (1.13 MB) & related other fonts in pkg	ClearlyU	Medium	Bitmap		Freeware	Mark Leisher. Computing Research lab, New Mexico State University.	
Code2000	53,068	63,546	239	0~5: Smoothed. 6~6: Hinted. 7+: Hinted & Smoothed.	v1.171 sfnt rev 1.1709; 2008-06-12	CODE2000.TTF (7.98 MB)	Code2000	Medium (Normal), Book, Regular	TTF	Any	Shareware (unrestricted)	James Kass	^{⸶} See SMP fonts for Code2001, Code2002.
DejaVu Sans	5,467	5,762	2,637	0~6: Smoothed. 7+: Hinted & Smoothed.	v2.32 sfnt rev 2.31999; 2010-08-22	DejaVuSans.ttf (667 KB)	DejaVu Sans	Medium (Normal), Book	OTF+TTO^{†}	Normal Sans	Bitstream Vera license and public domain for additions	Bitstream, Inc. Tavmjong Bah. public domain.	
Everson Mono	6,391	6,399	0	0~6: Smoothed. 7~12: Hinted. 13+: Hinted & Smoothed.	v5.203 sfnt rev v5.203 2010-07-03	Everson Mono.ttf (1.91 MB)	Everson Mono	Medium (Normal), Regular	TTF	Any	Shareware (unrestricted)	Michael Everson	Monospaced width.
Gentium	2,750+	4,600+	extensive but clustered into overly generalized groups	0~6: Smoothed. 7~12: Hinted. 13+: Hinted & Smoothed.	v7.000 2025-6-01	Gentium_Regular.ttf (971.3 kB)	Gentium	Regular, Medium (Book)	OpenType	Any	OFL	J. Victor Gaultney. SIL International	
GNU FreeFont	7,203	8,995	36,302	0~7: Smoothed. 8~16: Hinted. 17+: Hinted & Smoothed.	v0412.2263 sfnt rev 412.226 (FreeSerif); 2012-05-03	FreeSerif.ttf (3.2MiB) FreeSans.ttf (1.5MiB) FreeMono.ttf (572KiB)	FreeSerif FreeSans FreeMono	Medium (Normal)	TTF	Cove	GNU GPL	Free Software Foundation	
GNU Unifont (Unifont)	63,446	63,449	0	0+: Smoothed.	v15.0.06 2015-6-4	unifont- 8.0.01.ttf (12MiB) unifont_upper_csur- 8.0.01.ttf (2.2MiB)	unifont	Medium (Normal)	Bitmap, TTF, OTF	Any	GNU GPL	Roman Czyborra	^{⸷} More info.
HAN NOM A, HAN NOM B	32,328; 45,020	34,147; 45,175	0; 0	0~6: Smoothed. 7~12: Hinted. 13+: Hinted & Smoothed.	v2.0; 2005 sfnt rev 2; 2005-02-05	HAN NOM A.TTF (20.3 MB); HAN NOM B.TTF (32.2 MB)	HAN NOM A HAN NOM B	Medium (Normal), Book, Regular	TTF	No Fit	Freeware	Chan Nguyen, Thien Vien Chieu, To Minh Tam	^{⸸} More Info.
Horta	1,858	1,988	0		v0.7 2016-05-16	Horta demo.ttf (127 kB)	Horta		TTF	Sans	OFL	Christ Trek fonts	
Junicode	3,022	3,096	14,438	0~6: Smoothed. 7~13: Hinted. 14+: Hinted & Smoothed.	v0.6.17 sfnt rev 0.599991; 2009-07-11	Junicode -Regular.ttf (752 KB)	Junicode	Medium (Normal), Book, Regular	TTF	Any	GNU GPL	Peter S. Baker	More info.
Kelvinch	3,525	3,516	Roman 8231/64858; Italic 12732/85349; Bold 7751/87753; Bold-Italic 12364/78554	0~6: Smoothed. 7~13: Hinted. 14+: Hinted & Smoothed.	V3.1; 2016-04-03	Kelvinch-Roman.otf (1,070KB); Kelvinch-Italic.otf (1,198 KB); Kelvinch-Bold.otf (1,055 KB); Kelvinch-BoldItalic.otf (1,193 KB)	Kelvinch	Roman (Normal); Italic; Bold; Bold-Italic	OTF+TTO^{†}	Oblique Square Cove	OFL	Paul J. Miller	Kelvinch Download Page
Linux Libertine	2,549	2,552	0	0~6: Smoothed. 7~13: Hinted. 14+: Hinted & Smoothed.	v4.7.5 sfnt rev 4.7; 2010-06-15	LinLibertine _Re-4.7.5.ttf (893 KB)	Linux Libertine	Medium (Normal), Book, Regular	OTF+TTO^{†}	Any	GNU GPL, OFL	Philipp H. Poll	More Info.
Lucida Grande	2,245	2,826	0	0~6: Smoothed. 7~13: Hinted & Smoothed. 14+: Hinted & Smoothed.	v5.0d8e1 sfnt rev 1.2; 2003-03-07	Lucida Grande.ttf (1.07 MB)	Lucida Grande	Medium (Normal), Regular	OTF	Normal Sans	Proprietary	Bigelow & Holmes Inc	Included with Mac OS X. Any proportion.
Lucida Sans Unicode	1,765	1,776	0	0~6: Smoothed. 7~13: Hinted & Smoothed. 14+: Hinted & Smoothed.	v2.00 1998-08-12	l_10646.ttf (316 KB)	Lucida Sans	Medium (Normal), Regular	OTF+TTO^{†}	Normal Sans	Proprietary	Bigelow & Holmes Inc	Included with Microsoft Windows.
Microsoft JhengHei	28,958	29,220	583	0~6: Smoothed. 7~20: Hinted & Smoothed. 21+: Hinted & Smoothed.	v6.02 sfnt rev 6.02; 2009-02-25	msjh.ttf (20.6 MB)	Microsoft JhengHei	Medium (Normal), Book, Regular	OTF+TTO^{†}	Normal Sans	Proprietary	Microsoft Corporation	Included with Microsoft Windows 7
Microsoft Sans Serif	2,788	3,077	0	0~6: Smoothed. 7~14: Hinted. 15+: Hinted & Smoothed.	v5.02 sfnt rev 5.02; 2009-02-12	micross.ttf (637 KB)	Microsoft Sans Serif	Medium (Normal), Book, Regular	OTF+TTO^{†}	Normal Sans	Proprietary	Microsoft Corporation	Included with Microsoft Windows.
New Gulim	46,567	49,284	0	0~6: Smoothed. 7~13: Hinted. 14+: Hinted & Smoothed.	v3.10 sfnt rev 1; 2002-10-29	nGulim.ttf (24.5 MB)	New Gulim	Medium (Normal), Regular	TTF	Normal Sans. Obtuse Cove	Proprietary	HanYang System Co., LTD.	Included with Microsoft Office. Any Proportion.
Noto	65,535	65,535	0	N/A	1.001	N/A	Noto	Thin, Light, DemiLight, Regular, Medium, Bold, Black	OTF	Normal Sans	OFL	Google	Included with Android
PragmataPro	6,148	7,414	0	0~6: Smoothed. 7~13: Hinted. 14+: Hinted & Smoothed.	0.824; 2016-09-16	PragmataProR_0824.ttf (1.5 MB)	PragmataPro	Regular, Bold, Italic, Bold Italic, Mono Regular, Mono Bold, Mono Italic, Mono Bold Italic,	TTF	Normal Sans	Proprietary	Fabrizio Schiavi	
Quivira	11,053	10,486	0	0+: Smoothed.	v4.1	Quivira.otf (1.41 MB)	Quivira	Normal	OTF	Cove	Freeware	Alexander Lange	Proportional Serif. More Info.
Segoe UI Regular		5,008	8,293	0~6: Smoothed. 7+: Hinted & Smoothed	v5.32 2013-07-30	segoeui.ttf (822 KB)	Segoe UI	Regular	TTF	Any	Proprietary	Microsoft Corporation	Included with Microsoft Windows.
Squarish Sans CT	1,609	1,757	0^{‡}		v0.10 2011-09-22	Squarish Sans CT Regular.ttf (106 kB)	Squarish Sans CT		TTF	Sans	OFL	Christ Trek fonts	A version of the popular Bank Gothic
STIX	3,290	3,292	1,016	0+: Hinting & Smoothed.	v1.0.0 sfnt rev 1.0; 2010-04-29	STIXGeneral.otf (404 KB)	STIXGeneral	Medium (Normal), Book, Regular	OTF	Any	Freeware	The STI Pub Companies. The Institute of Electrical and Electronics Engineers, Inc. MicroPress, Inc. Elsevier, Inc.	More Info.
Sun-ExtA, Sun-ExtB	50,112; 47,564	50,016; 47,660	0; 0	(A) 0~6: Smoothed. 7~13: Hinted. 14+: Hinted & Smoothed. (B) 0~7: Smoothed. 8~18: Hinted. 19+: Hinted & Smoothed.	(A) v5.4 sfnt rev 5; 2009-01-03 (B) v5.4 sfnt rev 5.39999; 2009-02-02	Sun-ExtA.ttf (21.9 MB); Sun-ExtB.ttf (16.8 MB)	Sun-ExtA; Sun-ExtB	Medium (Normal), Book, Regular	TTF	No Fit	Both Freeware. Proprietary	okuc. Beijing ZhongYi Electronics Co.	^{§} More Info (in Chinese).
Tahoma	1,912	3,412	674	0~6: Smoothed. 7~12: Hinted. 13+: Hinted & Smoothed.	v5.06 2009-02-12	tahoma.ttf (681 KB)	Tahoma (typeface)	Medium (Normal), Regular	OTF+TTO^{†}	Normal Sans	Proprietary	Microsoft Corporation	Included with Microsoft Windows.
Times New Roman	2,790	3,414	867	0~6: Smoothed. 7~13: Hinted. 14+: Hinted & Smoothed.	v5.05 2009-02-06	times.ttf (816 KB)	Times New Roman	Medium (Normal), Regular	OTF+TTO^{†}	Cove	Proprietary;only some versions up to version 2.82 were Freeware	The Monotype Corporation.	Proportional Serif. Included with Microsoft Windows.
TITUS Cyberbit Basic	9,209	10,044	0	0~6: Smoothed. 7~12: Hinted. 13+: Hinted & Smoothed.	v3.0 (2000) sfnt rev 4; 2005-10-08	TITUSCBZ.TTF (1.91 MB)	TITUS Cyberbit Basic	Medium (Normal), Regular	TTF	Cove	Freeware	Bitstream Inc / TITUS project.	
WenQuanYi Bitmap Song	41,295	154,997	0	—N/a	1.0.0-RC1	—N/a	WenQuanYi Bitmap Song	Regular	Multi-strike Bitmap Font	Song(Serif) Style for Chinese	GNU GPL	—N/a	It has full coverage to GB18030 Hanzi at 11-16px font sizes. More info.
WenQuanYi Micro Hei	34,707	48,755	0	—N/a	0.2.0-beta	—N/a	WenQuanYi Micro Hei and WenQuanYi Micro Hei Mono	Regular, Light	TTC	Hei(Sans) Style for Chinese	GNU GPL	—N/a	Derived from the Droid Sans font (merged with Droid Sans Fallback) and is readable in compact sizes.
WenQuanYi Zen Hei	42,285	43,643	0	—N/a	v0.9.45 sfnt rev 0.89994; 2010-03-11	wqy-zenhei.ttc (16.0 MB)	WenQuanYi Zen Hei, WenQuanYi Zen Hei Mono and WenQuanYi Zen Hei Sharp	Medium, Regular	TTC	Hei(Sans) Style for Chinese	GNU GPL	Qianqian Fang and WenQuanYi Board of Trustees.	^{⸹} More info.
Y.OzFontN	21,957	57,621	0	0~18: Hinted & Smoothed. 19+: Hinted & Smoothed	v13.00 sfnt rev 5 Pen-Ji; 2010-08-24	YOzRN.TTC (13.5 MB)	YOzFontN	Regular	TTC	Any	Freeware	Y.OzVox	Sans-serif (for Japanese) and Monospace (for Latin). More info.
XITS	3,290	3,292	1,016	0+: Hinting & Smoothed.	v1.0.10 2011-04-25	xits-regular.otf (247 KB)	XITS	Medium (Normal), Book, Regular	OTF	Any	OFL	Khaled Hosny	First four columns are identical to STIX of which this is math extension. More Info.
Font	Char(s)	Glyphs	Kernpairs (standard)^{‡}	Point (range) : hinting/smoothing behavior	Version & date	Filename, size	Font family	Font weight, style	Font type	Serif style	License	Creator / author (copyright)	Notes

Note
^‡OTF+TTO: OpenType font with TrueType outlines.
^‡OpenType fonts sometimes do not contain a one-by-one kernpair table but a kern-by-classes table where groups of similar characters are seen as one kern group. For instance, V and W have nearly the same left and right geometry. So “0” does not mean that no kerning is supported.
^⸶Register after "reasonable" period (author's words).
^⸷Includes more than 27,000 Hanzi glyphs from WenQuanYi Bitmap Song font.
^⸸Han Nom A covers mainly CJK U Ideographs Ext A, and Han Nom B covers mostly Ext B.
^§Sun-Ext A covers 102 blocks of different languages. Sun-ExtB covers mostly CJK Supplement, CJK U Ideographs Ext B, C, TaiXuan Jing.
^⸹Zen Hei, Zen Hei Mono and Zen Hei Sharp co-exist in a single TTC file; also with embedded bitmaps. Latin/Hangul derived from UnDotum, Bopomofo derived from cwTeX, mono-spaced Latin from M+ M2 Light. Full CJK coverage. Included with Fedora Linux, Ubuntu Linux.

== Comparison of fonts ==
Number of characters included by the above version of fonts, for different Unicode blocks are listed below. Basic Latin (128: 0000–007F) means that in the range called 'Basic Latin', there are 128 assigned codes, numbered 0 to 7F. The cells then show the number of those codes which are covered by each font. Unicode blocks listed are valid for Unicode version 8.0.

Cells shaded green indicate complete coverage.
Cells shaded blue are not complete, but are the most complete of the fonts listed.
Empty cells indicate that no character exists in that block.

=== 0000–077F ===
Unicode Fonts
BMP (Plane 0)
Font Range	Arial	Arial Unicode MS	Bitstream Cyberbit	Cardo	Caslon Roman	Code2000	Charis SIL	Chrysanthi Unicode	ClearlyU	DejaVu Fonts	Doulos SIL	Everson Mono	GNU FreeFont	Gentium Plus	GNU Unifont	Junicode	Linux Libertine	Lucida Grande	Lucida Sans Unicode	Microsoft JhengHei	Microsoft Sans Serif	New Gulim	Sun-ExtA	Tahoma	Times New Roman	TITUS Cyberbit Basic	WenQuanYi Zen Hei	Y.OzFontN
Non-Unicode Glyphs	703	11,460	1,566	23		10,478	2,673	1		295	2,673	8	2,451	3,257	4	76	3	589		263	443	4,562	2,577	624	704	866	2,007	954
Unassigned Code Points (0000-10FFFF)			261		2		1	10		2	1	7	1	1	2,421	1	2	1		1		32	67			1	37	118
Total Characters in BMP (61,589: 0000–FFFF)	2,712		28,107	2,175	3,681	53,068	1,985	4,372		5,161	1,985	5,639	6,448	2,326	60,691	3,019	2,547	2,236		28,956	2,634	46,247	49,945	2,788	2,710	9,177	41,559	21,225
C0 Control Character (32: 0000–001F)			31				1				1		1	1	31			1		1		31	31				32	
Basic Latin (95: 0020–007E)	95	95	95	95	95	95	95	95	95	95	95	95	95	95	95	95	95	95	95	95	95	95	95	95	95	95	95	95
Delete Character (1: 007F-007F)	1	1	1	1		1	1	1	1	1	1	1	1		1	1	1		1		1	1	1	1	1	1	1	1
C1 Control Character (32: 0080-009F)			32												32								32					
Latin-1 Supplement (96: 00A0–00FF)	94	96	95	96	96	96	96	96	95	96	96	96	96	96	96	96	96	96	96	96	94	96	96	94	94	96	95	96
Latin Extended-A (128: 0100–017F)	128	128	128	127	128	128	128	128	128	128	128	128	128	128	128	128	128	128	128	8	128	128	128	128	128	128	29	128
Latin Extended-B (208: 0180–024F)	208	148	208	52	178	208	188	188	178	208	188	208	208	208	208	182	194	183	119	1	208	7	208	208	208	183	8	28
IPA Extensions (96: 0250–02AF)	96	89	96	96	94	96	96	94	94	96	96	96	96	96	96	94	96	96	89		96		96	96	96	96	96	55
Spacing Modifier Letters (80: 02B0–02FF)	80	57	79	80	63	80	75	63	62	63	75	80	80	75	80	63	80	80	57	12	80	10	80	80	80	80	11	14
Combining Diacritical Marks (112: 0300–036F)	112	72	112	112	82	112	103	82	82	93	103	112	112	107	112	109	111	106	68	1	109		112	110	112	106		32
Greek and Coptic (135: 0370–03FF)	126	105	134	124	110	134	17	76	110	134	17	135	134	120	135	80	110	106	91	117	126	73	127	123	126	117	72	76
Cyrillic (256: 0400–04FF)	254	226	253	2	238	256	214	238	244	256	214	256	256	214	256		230	244	153		254	94	253	254	254	246	92	66
Cyrillic Supplement (48: 0500–052F)	24				16	36	34		16	36	34	38	40	34	40			16			24		20	24	24	15		
Armenian (89: 0530–058F)		85			85	86		84	86	86		86	87		87								86	86		86		
Hebrew (87: 0590–05FF)	87	82	46	86	82	86		60	82	54		87	87		87		53	82	51		87		87	87	87	83		
Arabic (255: 0600–06FF)	225	194	60	10		185		69	201	161			252		254						232		225	225	225	183		
Syriac (77: 0700–074F)						50							77		77											76		
Arabic Supplement (48: 0750–077F)	30												48		48						30			30	30			
Range Font Range	Arial	Arial Unicode MS	Bitstream Cyberbit	Cardo	Caslon Roman	Code2000	Charis SIL	Chrysanthi Unicode	ClearlyU	DejaVu Fonts	Doulos SIL	Everson Mono	GNU FreeFont	Gentium Plus	GNU Unifont	Junicode	Linux Libertine	Lucida Grande	Lucida Sans Unicode	Microsoft JhengHei	Microsoft Sans Serif	New Gulim	Sun-ExtA	Tahoma	Times New Roman	TITUS Cyberbit Basic	WenQuanYi Zen Hei	Y.OzFontN

=== 0780–139F ===
Range Font Range	Arial	Arial Unicode MS	Bitstream Cyberbit	Cardo	Caslon Roman	Code2000	Charis SIL	Chrysanthi Unicode	ClearlyU	DejaVu Fonts	Doulos SIL	Everson Mono	GNU FreeFont	Gentium Plus	GNU Unifont	Junicode	Linux Libertine	Lucida Grande	Lucida Sans Unicode	Microsoft JhengHei	Microsoft Sans Serif	New Gulim	Sun-ExtA	Tahoma	Times New Roman	TITUS Cyberbit Basic	WenQuanYi Zen Hei	Y.OzFontN
Thaana (50: 0780–07BF)						50			50			50	50		50								50			50		
NKo (59: 07C0–07FF)						59				54					59													
Samaritan (61: 0800–083F)															61													
Mandaic (29: 0840–085F)															29													
Arabic Extended-A (50: 08A0–08FF)															39													
Devanagari (128: 0900–097F)		104				112		104	103				127		127								105			106		
Bengali (93: 0980–09FF)		89				91		89					92		92								90					
Gurmukhi (79: 0A00–0A7F)		75				79							79		79								77					
Gujarati (85: 0A80–0AFF)		78				83		78					84		84								78					
Oriya (90: 0B00–0B7F)		79				84							90		90								79					
Tamil (72: 0B80–0BFF)		61				71							72		72								70					
Telugu (96: 0C00–0C7F)		80				93							42		93								80					
Kannada (87: 0C80–0CFF)		80				86									86													
Malayalam (100: 0D00–0D7F)		78				95							98		98								78					
Sinhala (90: 0D80–0DFF)													80		80													
Thai (87: 0E00–0E7F)		87	87		86	87			87	1		87	87		87			87			87		87	87		87		
Lao (67: 0E80–0EFF)		65				65			65	65					67								65					
Tibetan (211: 0F00–0FFF)		168						168	55						211								193					
Myanmar (Burmese) (160: 1000–109F)						156									160								78					
Georgian (88: 10A0–10FF)		78		1		83			78	83		88	83		88	1							78			83		
Hangul Jamo: Choseong (96: 1100-115F)		91				91			91						96							96	96				47	
Hangul Jamo: Jungseong (72: 1160-11A7)		67				67									72							72	72				37	
Hangul Jamo: Jongseong (88: 11A8-11FF)		82				82									88							82	82				62	
Ethiopic (Ge'ez) (358: 1200–137F)						356			345				345		358								345			346		
Ethiopic Supplement (Ge'ez) (26: 1380–139F)						26									26													
Range Font Range	Arial	Arial Unicode MS	Bitstream Cyberbit	Cardo	Caslon Roman	Code2000	Charis SIL	Chrysanthi Unicode	ClearlyU	DejaVu Fonts	Doulos SIL	Everson Mono	GNU FreeFont	Gentium Plus	GNU Unifont	Junicode	Linux Libertine	Lucida Grande	Lucida Sans Unicode	Microsoft JhengHei	Microsoft Sans Serif	New Gulim	Sun-ExtA	Tahoma	Times New Roman	TITUS Cyberbit Basic	WenQuanYi Zen Hei	Y.OzFontN

=== 13A0–1DBF ===
Range Font Range	Arial	Arial Unicode MS	Bitstream Cyberbit	Cardo	Caslon Roman	Code2000	Charis SIL	Chrysanthi Unicode	ClearlyU	DejaVu Fonts	Doulos SIL	Everson Mono	GNU FreeFont	Gentium Plus	GNU Unifont	Junicode	Linux Libertine	Lucida Grande	Lucida Sans Unicode	Microsoft JhengHei	Microsoft Sans Serif	New Gulim	Sun-ExtA	Tahoma	Times New Roman	TITUS Cyberbit Basic	WenQuanYi Zen Hei	Y.OzFontN
Cherokee (92: 13A0–13FF)					85	85			85			92	85		85								85					
Unified Canadian Aboriginal Syllabics (640: 1400–167F)					29	640			630	433		640	640		640								640			29		
Ogham (29: 1680–169F)					29	29			29	29		29			29								29			29		
Runic (89: 16A0–16FF)				81	81	81		81	81			89	81		81	81							81			81		1
Tagalog (Baybayin) (20: 1700–171F)															20													
Hanunoo (Hanunó'o) (23: 1720–173F)						2							23		23								2					
Buhid (20: 1740–175F)						20									20								20					
Tagbanwa (18: 1760–177F)															18													
Khmer (114: 1780–17FF)						114									114								103					1
Mongolian (156: 1800–18AF)						155									156								155					
Unified Canadian Aboriginal Syllabics Extended (70: 18B0–18FF)					29	19						70	70		70								19					
Limbu (68: 1900–194F)						66									66								66					
Tai Le (35: 1950–197F)													35		35													
New Tai Lue (Tai Lü) (83: 1980–19DF)															83													
Khmer Symbols (32: 19E0–19FF)						32									32													
Buginese (30: 1A00–1A1F)						30							30		30													
Tai Tham (127: 1A20–1AAF)															127													
Combining Diacritical Marks Extended (15: 1AB0–1AFF)												15																
Balinese (121: 1B00–1B7F)															121													
Sundanese (64: 1B80–1BBF)															64													
Batak (56: 1BC0–1BFF)															56													
Lepcha (74: 1C00–1C4F)															74													
Ol Chiki (48: 1C50–1C7F)						48									48													
Sundanese Supplement (8: 1CC0–1CCF)															8													
Vedic Extensions (41: 1CD0–1CFF)															39													
Phonetic Extensions (128: 1D00–1D7F)	128			17		128	109			106	109	128	128	110	128	109	22	108			128		128	128	128	108		
Phonetic Extensions Supplement (64: 1D80–1DBF)	64					64	64			38	64	64	64		64		3				64		64	64	64			
Range Font Range	Arial	Arial Unicode MS	Bitstream Cyberbit	Cardo	Caslon Roman	Code2000	Charis SIL	Chrysanthi Unicode	ClearlyU	DejaVu Fonts	Doulos SIL	Everson Mono	GNU FreeFont	Gentium Plus	GNU Unifont	Junicode	Linux Libertine	Lucida Grande	Lucida Sans Unicode	Microsoft JhengHei	Microsoft Sans Serif	New Gulim	Sun-ExtA	Tahoma	Times New Roman	TITUS Cyberbit Basic	WenQuanYi Zen Hei	Y.OzFontN

=== 1DC0–257F ===
Range Font Range	Arial	Arial Unicode MS	Bitstream Cyberbit	Cardo	Caslon Roman	Code2000	Charis SIL	Chrysanthi Unicode	ClearlyU	DejaVu Fonts	Doulos SIL	Everson Mono	GNU FreeFont	Gentium Plus	GNU Unifont	Junicode	Linux Libertine	Lucida Grande	Lucida Sans Unicode	Microsoft JhengHei	Microsoft Sans Serif	New Gulim	Sun-ExtA	Tahoma	Times New Roman	TITUS Cyberbit Basic	WenQuanYi Zen Hei	Y.OzFontN
Combining Diacritical Marks Supplement (58: 1DC0–1DFF)	13			2		13	5			6	5	58	33	5	43	26					13		13	13	13			
Latin Extended Additional (256: 1E00–1EFF)	247	246	96	88	246	256	256	246	246	252	256	256	256	256	256	256	256	246	8		247	8	246	247	247	247		8
Greek Extended (233: 1F00–1FFF)	233	233		233	233	233		233	233	233		233	233	233	233	232	233	233			233		233	233	233	233		4
General Punctuation (111: 2000–206F)	54	63	96	65	69	106	74	56	77	107	74	111	101	74	111	77	59	85	67	27	45	25	97	44	54	62	20	91
Superscripts and Subscripts (42: 2070–209F)	6	28	34	9	28	29	34	29	28	34	34	42	34	34	42	29	34	29	28	1	6	6	34	6	6	29	6	34
Currency Symbols (31: 20A0-20CF)	22	13	25	6	16	22	22	15	16	23	22	30	26	22	27	2	9	18	12	17	22	4	22	22	22	12	2	18
Combining Diacritical Marks for Symbols (33: 20D0–20FF)	1	18	33		20	28	5		20	7	5	33	33	5	33	1		2			1		27	1	1			27
Letterlike Symbols (80: 2100–214F)	9	57	75	13	59	80	5	59	59	75	5	80	77	5	80	10	31	32	57	4	8	10	77	8	8	10	9	75
Number Forms (60: 2150–218F)	7	48	58	4	49	54	54	49	49	55	54	60	58	54	58	50	50	49	4	10	5	26	50	5	7	28	30	53
Arrows (112: 2190–21FF)	7	91	112	14	100	112	19	92	100	112	19	112	112	19	112		34	20	91	8		13	112		7	20	12	112
Mathematical Operators (256: 2200–22FF)	16	242	246	24	242	256	21	242	242	256	21	256	256	21	256	16	82	18	242	26	13	43	256	14	16	52	51	256
Miscellaneous Technical (251: 2300–23FF)	4	123	233	36	57	228	27	4	154	65	27	255	196	27	244	6	14	14	10	1		5	211		4	7	1	209
Control Pictures (39: 2400–243F)		37	39		39	39	1		39	2	1	39	39	1	39		1	1	37				39				1	4
Optical Character Recognition (11: 2440–245F)		11	11			11			10			11	11		11								11					11
Enclosed Alphanumerics (160: 2460–24FF)		139	160		73	160			139	10		160	10		160	160	114	1				82	160			112	139	160
Box Drawing (128: 2500–257F)	40	128	115	1	128	128		128				128	128		128					128	53		97	128	40	99	117	128
Range Font Range	Arial	Arial Unicode MS	Bitstream Cyberbit	Cardo	Caslon Roman	Code2000	Charis SIL	Chrysanthi Unicode	ClearlyU	DejaVu Fonts	Doulos SIL	Everson Mono	GNU FreeFont	Gentium Plus	GNU Unifont	Junicode	Linux Libertine	Lucida Grande	Lucida Sans Unicode	Microsoft JhengHei	Microsoft Sans Serif	New Gulim	Sun-ExtA	Tahoma	Times New Roman	TITUS Cyberbit Basic	WenQuanYi Zen Hei	Y.OzFontN

=== 2580–2DFF ===
Range Font Range	Arial	Arial Unicode MS	Bitstream Cyberbit	Cardo	Caslon Roman	Code2000	Charis SIL	Chrysanthi Unicode	ClearlyU	DejaVu Fonts	Doulos SIL	Everson Mono	GNU FreeFont	Gentium Plus	GNU Unifont	Junicode	Linux Libertine	Lucida Grande	Lucida Sans Unicode	Microsoft JhengHei	Microsoft Sans Serif	New Gulim	Sun-ExtA	Tahoma	Times New Roman	TITUS Cyberbit Basic	WenQuanYi Zen Hei	Y.OzFontN
Block Elements (32: 2580–259F)	8	22	20		22	32		22		32		32	32		32				21	18		8	32		8	10	20	32
Geometric Shapes (96: 25A0–25FF)	16	80	92	8	88	96	2	95	88	96	2	96	96	2	96	1	26	18	79	16	7	34	96	7	16	38	29	96
Miscellaneous Symbols (256: 2600–267F)	12	106	118	31	108	127		128		128		256	128		128	4	45		14	6	2	24	125	1	12	25	33	128
Dingbats (Zapf Dingbats) (192: 2700–27BF)		160		6	2	174	2	170	1	174	2	256	191	2	191	12	14	3					174					174
Miscellaneous Mathematical Symbols-A (48: 27C0–27EF)				3		28	2			2	2	48	40		48		1						16					16
Supplemental Arrows-A (16: 27F0–27FF)				8			2			23	2	16	16	22	16		4	2						12				28
Braille Patterns (256: 2800–28FF)						256			256	256		256	256		256	256							256					256
Supplemental Arrows-B (128: 2900–297F)				6		128				6		128			128								128					128
Miscellaneous Mathematical Symbols-B (128: 2980–29FF)				2		128				13			68		128			1					128					128
Supplemental Mathematical Operators (256: 2A00–2AFF)						256	10			72		194	27		256	1							256					256
Miscellaneous Symbols and Arrows (206: 2B00–2BFF)						82				35		1	55		87													15
Glagolitic (94: 2C00–2C5F)													86		94											94		
Latin Extended-C (32: 2C60-2C7F)	21					29	12			31	12	32	32	12	32	5	17				21		17	21	21			
Coptic (123: 2C80–2CFF)						114						123	66		123											114		
Georgian Supplement (40: 2D00–2D2F)												40			40											38		
Tifinagh (59: 2D30–2D7F)						55				55		59	57		59													
Ethiopic Extended (79: 2D80–2DDF)						79									79													
Cyrillic Extended-A (32: 2DE0–2DFF)												32	32		32													
Range Font Range	Arial	Arial Unicode MS	Bitstream Cyberbit	Cardo	Caslon Roman	Code2000	Charis SIL	Chrysanthi Unicode	ClearlyU	DejaVu Fonts	Doulos SIL	Everson Mono	GNU FreeFont	Gentium Plus	GNU Unifont	Junicode	Linux Libertine	Lucida Grande	Lucida Sans Unicode	Microsoft JhengHei	Microsoft Sans Serif	New Gulim	Sun-ExtA	Tahoma	Times New Roman	TITUS Cyberbit Basic	WenQuanYi Zen Hei	Y.OzFontN

=== 2E00–4DBF ===
Range Font Range	Arial	Arial Unicode MS	Bitstream Cyberbit	Cardo	Caslon Roman	Code2000	Charis SIL	Chrysanthi Unicode	ClearlyU	DejaVu Fonts	Doulos SIL	Everson Mono	GNU FreeFont	Gentium Plus	GNU Unifont	Junicode	Linux Libertine	Lucida Grande	Lucida Sans Unicode	Microsoft JhengHei	Microsoft Sans Serif	New Gulim	Sun-ExtA	Tahoma	Times New Roman	TITUS Cyberbit Basic	WenQuanYi Zen Hei	Y.OzFontN
Supplemental Punctuation (67: 2E00–2E7F)	1			24		49				6		68	37		60	22	9				1		1	1	1			
CJK Radicals Supplement (115: 2E80–2EFF)						115									115								115				115	115
Kangxi Radicals (214: 2F00–2FDF)						214									214								214				214	214
Ideographic Description Characters (12: 2FF0–2FFF)						12									12													12
CJK Symbols and Punctuation (64: 3000–303F)		57	64	12	9	64		40					18		64					64		17	64			31	46	45
Hiragana (93: 3040–309F)		90	93		90	93		90					86		93					93		83	93			90	93	93
Katakana (96: 30A0–30FF)		94	96		94	96		94					92		96					96		86	96			94	95	96
Bopomofo (41: 3100–312F)		40	41			41		37							41					39			40			37	41	
Hangul Compatibility Jamo (94: 3130–318F)		94	94			94			94						94							94	94				94	1
Kanbun (16: 3190–319F)		16	16			16		14							16					16			16				14	16
Bopomofo Extended (27: 31A0–31BF)			24			24									27					24			24				4	
CJK Strokes (36: 31C0–31EF)			36			36									36								36				36	
Katakana Phonetic Extensions (16: 31F0–31FF)			16			16									16					16			16					16
Enclosed CJK Letters and Months (254: 3200–32FF)		202	254			242			58						254					1		58	232				206	179
CJK Compatibility (256: 3300–33FF)		249	256			256		105							256					11		80	249				154	256
CJK Unified Ideographs Extension A (6,582: 3400–4DBF)			2,350			6,646		1		64					6,646					6,582		6,582	6,646				6,646	180
Range Font Range	Arial	Arial Unicode MS	Bitstream Cyberbit	Cardo	Caslon Roman	Code2000	Charis SIL	Chrysanthi Unicode	ClearlyU	DejaVu Fonts	Doulos SIL	Everson Mono	GNU FreeFont	Gentium Plus	GNU Unifont	Junicode	Linux Libertine	Lucida Grande	Lucida Sans Unicode	Microsoft JhengHei	Microsoft Sans Serif	New Gulim	Sun-ExtA	Tahoma	Times New Roman	TITUS Cyberbit Basic	WenQuanYi Zen Hei	Y.OzFontN

=== 4DC0–FAFF ===
Range Font Range	Arial	Arial Unicode MS	Bitstream Cyberbit	Cardo	Caslon Roman	Code2000	Charis SIL	Chrysanthi Unicode	ClearlyU	DejaVu Fonts	Doulos SIL	Everson Mono	GNU FreeFont	Gentium Plus	GNU Unifont	Junicode	Linux Libertine	Lucida Grande	Lucida Sans Unicode	Microsoft JhengHei	Microsoft Sans Serif	New Gulim	Sun-ExtA	Tahoma	Times New Roman	TITUS Cyberbit Basic	WenQuanYi Zen Hei	Y.OzFontN
Yijing Hexagram Symbols (64: 4DC0–4DFF)						64				64		64			64					6		6	70				70	
CJK Unified Ideographs (Han Unification) (20,950: 4E00–9FFF)		20,902	20,902			20,932		79							20,941					20,902		20,902	20,924				20,940	9,845
Yi Syllables (1,165: A000–A3FF)						1,165									1,165								1,165					
Yi Radicals (55: A490–A4AF)		0				55									55								55					
Lisu (Fraser alphabet) (48: A4D0–A4FF)												48			48													
Vai (300: A500–A63F)						300							300		300													
Cyrillic Extended-B (96: A640–A69F)						78				31		96	80		89													
Bamum (88: A6A0-A6FF)															88													
Modifier Tone Letters (32: A700–A71F)	9					32	1			20	1		32	1	32		1				9		4	9	9			
Latin Extended-D (159: A720-A7FF)	7					114	28			57	28	160	91	28	134	97	3				7		2	7	7			
Syloti Nagri (44: A800–A82F)															44													
Common Indic Number Forms (10: A830–A83F)															10													
Phags-pa (56: A840–A87F)						56									56													
Saurashtra (81: A880–A8DF)						81									81													
Devanagari Extended (30: A8E0–A8FF)													28		28													
Kayah Li (48: A900–A92F)						48							48		48													
Rejang (37: A930–A95F)						37						37			37													
Hangul Jamo Extended-A (29: A960–A97F)															29													
Javanese (91: A980–A9DF)															91													
Myanmar Extended-B (31: A9E0–A9FF)																												
Cham (83: AA00–AA5F)						83									83													
Myanmar Extended-A (32: AA60–AA7F)															28													
Tai Viet (72: AA80–AADF)															72													
Meetei Mayek Extensions (23: AAE0–AAFF)															23													
Ethiopic Extended-A (32: AB00–AB2F)															32													
Latin Extended-E (54: AB30–AB6F)																												
Cherokee Supplement (80: AB70–ABBF)																												
Meetei Mayek (56: ABC0–ABF9)															56													
Hangul Syllables (11,172: AC00–D7AF)		11,172	2,350			11,172			2,350						11,172							11,172	11,172				11,172	6
Hangul Jamo Extended-B (72: D7B0–D7FF)															72													
Private Use Area (6,400: E000–F8FF)	55	43	20	565	148	1,373	352	788	372	29	229		40	229	6,400	961	276	6	16	47	5,916		84	55	4,649	4,626		6,400
CJK Compatibility Ideographs (472: F900–FAFF)		302	302			437									472						302	16	466			1	455	363
Range Font Range	Arial	Arial Unicode MS	Bitstream Cyberbit	Cardo	Caslon Roman	Code2000	Charis SIL	Chrysanthi Unicode	ClearlyU	DejaVu Fonts	Doulos SIL	Everson Mono	GNU FreeFont	Gentium Plus	GNU Unifont	Junicode	Linux Libertine	Lucida Grande	Lucida Sans Unicode	Microsoft JhengHei	Microsoft Sans Serif	New Gulim	Sun-ExtA	Tahoma	Times New Roman	TITUS Cyberbit Basic	WenQuanYi Zen Hei	Y.OzFontN

=== FB00–FFFF ===
Range Font Range	Arial	Arial Unicode MS	Bitstream Cyberbit	Cardo	Caslon Roman	Code2000	Charis SIL	Chrysanthi Unicode	ClearlyU	DejaVu Fonts	Doulos SIL	Everson Mono	GNU FreeFont	Gentium Plus	GNU Unifont	Junicode	Linux Libertine	Lucida Grande	Lucida Sans Unicode	Microsoft JhengHei	Microsoft Sans Serif	New Gulim	Sun-ExtA	Tahoma	Times New Roman	TITUS Cyberbit Basic	WenQuanYi Zen Hei	Y.OzFontN
Alphabetic Presentation Forms (Latin Lig + Armenian Lig + Hebrew Lig) (58: FB00–FB4F)	48	57	26	53	42	58	5	52	58	58	5	58	58	5	58	7	7	32	3		48	2		48	48	53		7
Latin Ligatures (7: FB00–FB06)	2	7	2	7	7	7	5	5	7	7	5	7	7	5	7	7	7	5			2	2		2	2	2		7
Armenian Ligatures (5: FB13–FB17)		5			1	5		5	5	5		5	5		5											5		
Hebrew Ligatures / Pointed Letters (46: FB1D–FB4F)	46	45	2	46	34	46		42	46	46		46	46		46			27			46			46	46	46		
Arabic Presentation Forms-A (611: FB50–FDFF)	90	593	62			155		22	128	98			169		611						44			89	89	187		25
Variation Selectors (16: FE00–FE0F)			16			16	16			16	16	16		16	16													16
Vertical Forms (10: FE10–FE1F)			10												10					10			10				2	
Combining Half Marks (16: FE20–FE2F)	4	4	7			4	4		4	4	4	16	7	4	7						4		4	4	4			
CJK Compatibility Forms (32: FE30–FE4F)		28	32			28									32					32			28			27	32	32
Small Form Variants (26: FE50–FE6F)		26	26			26			18						26	2				26			26			25	25	
Arabic Presentation Forms-B (141: FE70–FEFF)	85	139	120			139	1	125	140	140	1		141		141			1	1		53			87	85	139		
Byte Order Mark (1: FEFF)						1	1			1			1	1	1			1			1							
Halfwidth and Fullwidth Forms (225: FF00–FFEF)		223	166		171	186			152						225					225		100	224			157	101	172
Latin Full Width Forms (94: FF01-FF5E)		94	94		94	94									94							94	94			94	94	94
KataKana Half Width Forms (63: FF61-FF9F)		63	63		63	63									63					63			63			63		63
Hangul Jamo Half Width Forms (52: FFA0-FFDC)		52				15									52					52			51					
Specials (5: FFF0–FFFF)	1	2		1	1	3	5		1	5	5	5	5	5	5		1	1			2	1	2	2	1			
Range Font	Arial	Arial Unicode MS	Bitstream Cyberbit	Cardo	Caslon Roman	Code2000	Charis SIL	Chrysanthi Unicode	ClearlyU	DejaVu Fonts	Doulos SIL	Everson Mono	GNU FreeFont	Gentium Plus	GNU Unifont	Junicode	Linux Libertine	Lucida Grande	Lucida Sans Unicode	Microsoft JhengHei	Microsoft Sans Serif	New Gulim	Sun-ExtA	Tahoma	Times New Roman	TITUS Cyberbit Basic	WenQuanYi Zen Hei	Y.OzFontN
BMP (Plane 0)

== List of SMP Unicode fonts ==
List of Unicode fonts supporting SMP characters
Font	Char(s)	Glyphs	Kernpairs (Standard)^{‡}	Range(Point): Hinting/ Smoothing Behavior	Version & Date	Filename, Size	Font Family	Font Weight, style	Font type	Serif style	License	Creator / Author (Copyright)	Notes
Code2001	2,985	3,135	0	0~5: Smoothed. 6~6: Hinted. 7+: Hinted & Smoothed.	v0.919 sfnt rev 0.918945; 2008-04-04	CODE2001.TTF (485 KB)	Code2001	Medium (Normal), Book, Regular	TTF	Any	Freeware	James Kass	More info.
New Athena Unicode	2,985	2,033	0	0~6: Smoothed. 7~12: Hinted. 13+: Hinted & Smoothed.	v3.710 sfnt rev 3.70999; 2010-05-02	newathu.ttf (769 KB)	New Athena Unicode	Medium (Normal), Book, Regular	TTF	Any	Freeware. SIL OFL.	American Philological Association	More info.
MPH 2B Damase	2,743	2,895	192	0~6: Smoothed. 7~12: Hinted. 13+: Hinted & Smoothed.	v002.010 sfnt rev 1; 2005-10-18	damase_v.2.ttf (879 KB)	MPH 2B Damase	Medium (Normal), Book, Regular	TTF	Any	Freeware.	Public Domain 2005. Mark Williamson.	Includes 2092 BMP chars. More info.

=== 10000–1F9FF ===
Unicode blocks listed are valid for Unicode version 8.0.

SMP (Plane 1)
Font Range	Arial	Arial Unicode MS	Bitstream Cyberbit	Cardo	Caslon Roman	Code2001	Charis SIL	Chrysanthi Unicode	ClearlyU	DejaVu Fonts	Doulos SIL	Everson Mono	GNU FreeFont	Gentium Plus	GNU Unifont	Junicode	Linux Libertine	Lucida Grande	Lucida Sans Unicode	Microsoft JhengHei	Microsoft Sans Serif	MPH 2B Damase	New Athena Unicode	New Gulim	STIXGeneral	Sun-ExtB	Tahoma	Times New Roman	TITUS Cyberbit Basic	WenQuanYi Zen Hei	Y.OzFontN
Total Characters in SMP (11,833: 10000–1FFFF)	—N/a	—N/a	—N/a	222	—N/a	1,989	2	—N/a	—N/a	304	2	745	1,638	2	4,875	—N/a	—N/a	—N/a	—N/a	—N/a	—N/a	649	203	—N/a	994	87	—N/a	—N/a	—N/a	106	210
Linear B Syllabary (88: 10000–1007F)	—N/a	—N/a	—N/a	—N/a	—N/a	88	—N/a	—N/a	—N/a	—N/a	—N/a	88	—N/a	—N/a	88	—N/a	—N/a	—N/a	—N/a	—N/a	—N/a	74	—N/a	—N/a	—N/a	—N/a	—N/a	—N/a	—N/a	88	—N/a
Linear B Ideograms (123: 10080–100FF)	—N/a	—N/a	—N/a	—N/a	—N/a	123	—N/a	—N/a	—N/a	—N/a	—N/a	123	—N/a	—N/a	123	—N/a	—N/a	—N/a	—N/a	—N/a	—N/a	73	—N/a	—N/a	—N/a	—N/a	—N/a	—N/a	—N/a	—N/a	—N/a
Aegean Numbers (57: 10100–1013F)	—N/a	—N/a	—N/a	—N/a	—N/a	—N/a	—N/a	—N/a	—N/a	—N/a	—N/a	57	—N/a	—N/a	—N/a	—N/a	—N/a	—N/a	—N/a	—N/a	—N/a	—N/a	—N/a	—N/a	—N/a	—N/a	—N/a	—N/a	—N/a	—N/a	—N/a
Ancient Greek Numbers (77: 10140–1018F)	—N/a	—N/a	—N/a	75	—N/a	—N/a	—N/a	—N/a	—N/a	—N/a	—N/a	77	5	—N/a	75	—N/a	—N/a	—N/a	—N/a	—N/a	—N/a	—N/a	75	—N/a	—N/a	—N/a	—N/a	—N/a	—N/a	—N/a	—N/a
Ancient Symbols (13: 10190–101CF)	—N/a	—N/a	—N/a	—N/a	—N/a	—N/a	—N/a	—N/a	—N/a	—N/a	—N/a	13	—N/a	—N/a	12	—N/a	—N/a	—N/a	—N/a	—N/a	—N/a	—N/a	12	—N/a	—N/a	—N/a	—N/a	—N/a	—N/a	—N/a	—N/a
Phaistos Disc (46: 101D0–101FF)	—N/a	—N/a	—N/a	—N/a	—N/a	46	—N/a	—N/a	—N/a	—N/a	—N/a	46	—N/a	—N/a	46	—N/a	—N/a	—N/a	—N/a	—N/a	—N/a	—N/a	—N/a	—N/a	—N/a	—N/a	—N/a	—N/a	—N/a	—N/a	—N/a
Lycian (29: 10280–1029F)	—N/a	—N/a	—N/a	—N/a	—N/a	—N/a	—N/a	—N/a	—N/a	—N/a	—N/a	29	—N/a	—N/a	29	—N/a	—N/a	—N/a	—N/a	—N/a	—N/a	—N/a	—N/a	—N/a	—N/a	—N/a	—N/a	—N/a	—N/a	—N/a	—N/a
Carian (49: 102A0-102DF)	—N/a	—N/a	—N/a	—N/a	—N/a	—N/a	—N/a	—N/a	—N/a	—N/a	—N/a	49	—N/a	—N/a	49	—N/a	—N/a	—N/a	—N/a	—N/a	—N/a	—N/a	—N/a	—N/a	—N/a	—N/a	—N/a	—N/a	—N/a	—N/a	—N/a
Coptic Epact Numbers (28: 102E0–102FF)	—N/a	—N/a	—N/a	—N/a	—N/a	—N/a	—N/a	—N/a	—N/a	—N/a	—N/a	—N/a	—N/a	—N/a	—N/a	—N/a	—N/a	—N/a	—N/a	—N/a	—N/a	—N/a	—N/a	—N/a	—N/a	—N/a	—N/a	—N/a	—N/a	—N/a	—N/a
Old Italic (36: 10300–1032F)	—N/a	—N/a	—N/a	35	—N/a	35	—N/a	—N/a	—N/a	—N/a	—N/a	36	35	—N/a	35	—N/a	—N/a	—N/a	—N/a	—N/a	—N/a	35	35	—N/a	—N/a	—N/a	—N/a	—N/a	—N/a	—N/a	—N/a
Gothic (27: 10330–1034F)	—N/a	—N/a	—N/a	27	—N/a	27	—N/a	—N/a	—N/a	—N/a	—N/a	27	27	—N/a	27	—N/a	—N/a	—N/a	—N/a	—N/a	—N/a	27	—N/a	—N/a	—N/a	—N/a	—N/a	—N/a	—N/a	—N/a	—N/a
Old Permic (43: 10350–1037F)	—N/a	—N/a	—N/a	—N/a	—N/a	—N/a	—N/a	—N/a	—N/a	—N/a	—N/a	43	—N/a	—N/a	—N/a	—N/a	—N/a	—N/a	—N/a	—N/a	—N/a	—N/a	—N/a	—N/a	—N/a	—N/a	—N/a	—N/a	—N/a	—N/a	—N/a
Ugaritic (31: 10380–1039F)	—N/a	—N/a	—N/a	—N/a	—N/a	31	—N/a	—N/a	—N/a	—N/a	—N/a	—N/a	31	—N/a	31	—N/a	—N/a	—N/a	—N/a	—N/a	—N/a	31	—N/a	—N/a	—N/a	—N/a	—N/a	—N/a	—N/a	—N/a	—N/a
Old Persian (50: 103A0–103DF)	—N/a	—N/a	—N/a	—N/a	—N/a	50	—N/a	—N/a	—N/a	—N/a	—N/a	—N/a	50	—N/a	50	—N/a	—N/a	—N/a	—N/a	—N/a	—N/a	50	—N/a	—N/a	—N/a	—N/a	—N/a	—N/a	—N/a	—N/a	—N/a
Deseret (80: 10400–1044F)	—N/a	—N/a	—N/a	—N/a	—N/a	80	—N/a	—N/a	—N/a	—N/a	—N/a	80	—N/a	—N/a	80	—N/a	—N/a	—N/a	—N/a	—N/a	—N/a	76	—N/a	—N/a	—N/a	—N/a	—N/a	—N/a	—N/a	—N/a	—N/a
Shavian (48: 10450–1047F)	—N/a	—N/a	—N/a	—N/a	—N/a	48	—N/a	—N/a	—N/a	—N/a	—N/a	48	—N/a	—N/a	48	—N/a	—N/a	—N/a	—N/a	—N/a	—N/a	48	—N/a	—N/a	—N/a	—N/a	—N/a	—N/a	—N/a	—N/a	—N/a
Osmanya (40: 10480–104AF)	—N/a	—N/a	—N/a	—N/a	—N/a	40	—N/a	—N/a	—N/a	—N/a	—N/a	—N/a	40	—N/a	40	—N/a	—N/a	—N/a	—N/a	—N/a	—N/a	40	—N/a	—N/a	—N/a	—N/a	—N/a	—N/a	—N/a	—N/a	—N/a
Elbasan (40: 10500–1052F)	—N/a	—N/a	—N/a	—N/a	—N/a	—N/a	—N/a	—N/a	—N/a	—N/a	—N/a	40	—N/a	—N/a	—N/a	—N/a	—N/a	—N/a	—N/a	—N/a	—N/a	—N/a	—N/a	—N/a	—N/a	—N/a	—N/a	—N/a	—N/a	—N/a	—N/a
Caucasian Albanian (53: 10530–1056F)	—N/a	—N/a	—N/a	—N/a	—N/a	—N/a	—N/a	—N/a	—N/a	—N/a	—N/a	—N/a	—N/a	—N/a	—N/a	—N/a	—N/a	—N/a	—N/a	—N/a	—N/a	—N/a	—N/a	—N/a	—N/a	—N/a	—N/a	—N/a	—N/a	—N/a	—N/a
Linear A (341: 10600–1077F)	—N/a	—N/a	—N/a	—N/a	—N/a	—N/a	—N/a	—N/a	—N/a	—N/a	—N/a	—N/a	—N/a	—N/a	—N/a	—N/a	—N/a	—N/a	—N/a	—N/a	—N/a	—N/a	—N/a	—N/a	—N/a	—N/a	—N/a	—N/a	—N/a	—N/a	—N/a
Cypriot Syllabary (55: 10800–1083F)	—N/a	—N/a	—N/a	—N/a	—N/a	55	—N/a	—N/a	—N/a	—N/a	—N/a	55	—N/a	—N/a	55	—N/a	—N/a	—N/a	—N/a	—N/a	—N/a	55	—N/a	—N/a	—N/a	—N/a	—N/a	—N/a	—N/a	—N/a	—N/a
Imperial Aramaic (31: 10840–1085F)	—N/a	—N/a	—N/a	—N/a	—N/a	—N/a	—N/a	—N/a	—N/a	—N/a	—N/a	—N/a	—N/a	—N/a	31	—N/a	—N/a	—N/a	—N/a	—N/a	—N/a	—N/a	—N/a	—N/a	—N/a	—N/a	—N/a	—N/a	—N/a	—N/a	—N/a
Palmyrene (32: 10860–1087F)	—N/a	—N/a	—N/a	—N/a	—N/a	—N/a	—N/a	—N/a	—N/a	—N/a	—N/a	—N/a	—N/a	—N/a	—N/a	—N/a	—N/a	—N/a	—N/a	—N/a	—N/a	—N/a	—N/a	—N/a	—N/a	—N/a	—N/a	—N/a	—N/a	—N/a	—N/a
Nabataean (40: 10880–108AF)	—N/a	—N/a	—N/a	—N/a	—N/a	—N/a	—N/a	—N/a	—N/a	—N/a	—N/a	—N/a	—N/a	—N/a	—N/a	—N/a	—N/a	—N/a	—N/a	—N/a	—N/a	—N/a	—N/a	—N/a	—N/a	—N/a	—N/a	—N/a	—N/a	—N/a	—N/a
Hatran (26: 108E0–108FF)	—N/a	—N/a	—N/a	—N/a	—N/a	—N/a	—N/a	—N/a	—N/a	—N/a	—N/a	—N/a	—N/a	—N/a	—N/a	—N/a	—N/a	—N/a	—N/a	—N/a	—N/a	—N/a	—N/a	—N/a	—N/a	—N/a	—N/a	—N/a	—N/a	—N/a	—N/a
Phoenician (29: 10900–1091F)	—N/a	—N/a	—N/a	—N/a	—N/a	27	—N/a	—N/a	—N/a	—N/a	—N/a	—N/a	29	—N/a	29	—N/a	—N/a	—N/a	—N/a	—N/a	—N/a	27	—N/a	—N/a	—N/a	—N/a	—N/a	—N/a	—N/a	—N/a	—N/a
Lydian (27: 10920–1093F)	—N/a	—N/a	—N/a	—N/a	—N/a	—N/a	—N/a	—N/a	—N/a	—N/a	—N/a	—N/a	—N/a	—N/a	27	—N/a	—N/a	—N/a	—N/a	—N/a	—N/a	—N/a	—N/a	—N/a	—N/a	—N/a	—N/a	—N/a	—N/a	—N/a	—N/a
Meroitic Hieroglyphs (32: 10980–1099F)	—N/a	—N/a	—N/a	—N/a	—N/a	—N/a	—N/a	—N/a	—N/a	—N/a	—N/a	—N/a	—N/a	—N/a	32	—N/a	—N/a	—N/a	—N/a	—N/a	—N/a	—N/a	—N/a	—N/a	—N/a	—N/a	—N/a	—N/a	—N/a	—N/a	—N/a
Meroitic Cursive (90: 109A0–109FF)	—N/a	—N/a	—N/a	—N/a	—N/a	—N/a	—N/a	—N/a	—N/a	—N/a	—N/a	—N/a	—N/a	—N/a	26	—N/a	—N/a	—N/a	—N/a	—N/a	—N/a	—N/a	—N/a	—N/a	—N/a	—N/a	—N/a	—N/a	—N/a	—N/a	—N/a
Kharosthi (65: 10A00–10A5F)	—N/a	—N/a	—N/a	—N/a	—N/a	—N/a	—N/a	—N/a	—N/a	—N/a	—N/a	—N/a	—N/a	—N/a	65	—N/a	—N/a	—N/a	—N/a	—N/a	—N/a	65	—N/a	—N/a	—N/a	—N/a	—N/a	—N/a	—N/a	—N/a	—N/a
Old South Arabian (32: 10A60–10A7F)	—N/a	—N/a	—N/a	—N/a	—N/a	—N/a	—N/a	—N/a	—N/a	—N/a	—N/a	—N/a	—N/a	—N/a	32	—N/a	—N/a	—N/a	—N/a	—N/a	—N/a	—N/a	—N/a	—N/a	—N/a	—N/a	—N/a	—N/a	—N/a	—N/a	—N/a
Old North Arabian (32: 10A80–10A9F)	—N/a	—N/a	—N/a	—N/a	—N/a	—N/a	—N/a	—N/a	—N/a	—N/a	—N/a	—N/a	—N/a	—N/a	—N/a	—N/a	—N/a	—N/a	—N/a	—N/a	—N/a	—N/a	—N/a	—N/a	—N/a	—N/a	—N/a	—N/a	—N/a	—N/a	—N/a
Manichaean (51: 10AC0–10AFF)	—N/a	—N/a	—N/a	—N/a	—N/a	—N/a	—N/a	—N/a	—N/a	—N/a	—N/a	—N/a	—N/a	—N/a	—N/a	—N/a	—N/a	—N/a	—N/a	—N/a	—N/a	—N/a	—N/a	—N/a	—N/a	—N/a	—N/a	—N/a	—N/a	—N/a	—N/a
Avestan (61: 10B00–10B3F)	—N/a	—N/a	—N/a	—N/a	—N/a	—N/a	—N/a	—N/a	—N/a	—N/a	—N/a	—N/a	—N/a	—N/a	61	—N/a	—N/a	—N/a	—N/a	—N/a	—N/a	—N/a	—N/a	—N/a	—N/a	—N/a	—N/a	—N/a	—N/a	—N/a	—N/a
Inscriptional Parthian (30: 10B40–10B5F)	—N/a	—N/a	—N/a	—N/a	—N/a	—N/a	—N/a	—N/a	—N/a	—N/a	—N/a	—N/a	—N/a	—N/a	30	—N/a	—N/a	—N/a	—N/a	—N/a	—N/a	—N/a	—N/a	—N/a	—N/a	—N/a	—N/a	—N/a	—N/a	—N/a	—N/a
Inscriptional Pahlavi (27: 10B60–10B7F)	—N/a	—N/a	—N/a	—N/a	—N/a	—N/a	—N/a	—N/a	—N/a	—N/a	—N/a	—N/a	—N/a	—N/a	27	—N/a	—N/a	—N/a	—N/a	—N/a	—N/a	—N/a	—N/a	—N/a	—N/a	—N/a	—N/a	—N/a	—N/a	—N/a	—N/a
Psalter Pahlavi (29: 10B80–10BAF)	—N/a	—N/a	—N/a	—N/a	—N/a	—N/a	—N/a	—N/a	—N/a	—N/a	—N/a	—N/a	—N/a	—N/a	—N/a	—N/a	—N/a	—N/a	—N/a	—N/a	—N/a	—N/a	—N/a	—N/a	—N/a	—N/a	—N/a	—N/a	—N/a	—N/a	—N/a
Old Turkic (73: 10C00–10C4F)	—N/a	—N/a	—N/a	—N/a	—N/a	—N/a	—N/a	—N/a	—N/a	—N/a	—N/a	—N/a	—N/a	—N/a	73	—N/a	—N/a	—N/a	—N/a	—N/a	—N/a	—N/a	—N/a	—N/a	—N/a	—N/a	—N/a	—N/a	—N/a	—N/a	—N/a
Old Hungarian (108: 10C80–10CFF)	—N/a	—N/a	—N/a	—N/a	—N/a	—N/a	—N/a	—N/a	—N/a	—N/a	—N/a	—N/a	—N/a	—N/a	—N/a	—N/a	—N/a	—N/a	—N/a	—N/a	—N/a	—N/a	—N/a	—N/a	—N/a	—N/a	—N/a	—N/a	—N/a	—N/a	—N/a
Rumi Numeral Symbols (31: 10E60–10E7F)	—N/a	—N/a	—N/a	—N/a	—N/a	—N/a	—N/a	—N/a	—N/a	—N/a	—N/a	—N/a	—N/a	—N/a	31	—N/a	—N/a	—N/a	—N/a	—N/a	—N/a	—N/a	—N/a	—N/a	—N/a	—N/a	—N/a	—N/a	—N/a	—N/a	—N/a
Brahmi (109: 11000–1107F)	—N/a	—N/a	—N/a	—N/a	—N/a	—N/a	—N/a	—N/a	—N/a	—N/a	—N/a	—N/a	—N/a	—N/a	108	—N/a	—N/a	—N/a	—N/a	—N/a	—N/a	—N/a	—N/a	—N/a	—N/a	—N/a	—N/a	—N/a	—N/a	—N/a	—N/a
Kaithi (66: 11080–110CF)	—N/a	—N/a	—N/a	—N/a	—N/a	—N/a	—N/a	—N/a	—N/a	—N/a	—N/a	—N/a	—N/a	—N/a	66	—N/a	—N/a	—N/a	—N/a	—N/a	—N/a	—N/a	—N/a	—N/a	—N/a	—N/a	—N/a	—N/a	—N/a	—N/a	—N/a
Sora Sompeng (35: 110D0–110FF)	—N/a	—N/a	—N/a	—N/a	—N/a	—N/a	—N/a	—N/a	—N/a	—N/a	—N/a	—N/a	—N/a	—N/a	35	—N/a	—N/a	—N/a	—N/a	—N/a	—N/a	—N/a	—N/a	—N/a	—N/a	—N/a	—N/a	—N/a	—N/a	—N/a	—N/a
Chakma (67: 11100–1114F)	—N/a	—N/a	—N/a	—N/a	—N/a	—N/a	—N/a	—N/a	—N/a	—N/a	—N/a	—N/a	—N/a	—N/a	67	—N/a	—N/a	—N/a	—N/a	—N/a	—N/a	—N/a	—N/a	—N/a	—N/a	—N/a	—N/a	—N/a	—N/a	—N/a	—N/a
Mahajani (39: 11150–1117F)	—N/a	—N/a	—N/a	—N/a	—N/a	—N/a	—N/a	—N/a	—N/a	—N/a	—N/a	—N/a	—N/a	—N/a	—N/a	—N/a	—N/a	—N/a	—N/a	—N/a	—N/a	—N/a	—N/a	—N/a	—N/a	—N/a	—N/a	—N/a	—N/a	—N/a	—N/a
Sharada (94: 11180–111DF)	—N/a	—N/a	—N/a	—N/a	—N/a	—N/a	—N/a	—N/a	—N/a	—N/a	—N/a	—N/a	—N/a	—N/a	83	—N/a	—N/a	—N/a	—N/a	—N/a	—N/a	—N/a	—N/a	—N/a	—N/a	—N/a	—N/a	—N/a	—N/a	—N/a	—N/a
Sinhala Archaic Numbers (20: 111E0–111FF)	—N/a	—N/a	—N/a	—N/a	—N/a	—N/a	—N/a	—N/a	—N/a	—N/a	—N/a	—N/a	—N/a	—N/a	—N/a	—N/a	—N/a	—N/a	—N/a	—N/a	—N/a	—N/a	—N/a	—N/a	—N/a	—N/a	—N/a	—N/a	—N/a	—N/a	—N/a
Khojki (61: 11200–1124F)	—N/a	—N/a	—N/a	—N/a	—N/a	—N/a	—N/a	—N/a	—N/a	—N/a	—N/a	—N/a	—N/a	—N/a	—N/a	—N/a	—N/a	—N/a	—N/a	—N/a	—N/a	—N/a	—N/a	—N/a	—N/a	—N/a	—N/a	—N/a	—N/a	—N/a	—N/a
Multani (38: 11280–112AF)	—N/a	—N/a	—N/a	—N/a	—N/a	—N/a	—N/a	—N/a	—N/a	—N/a	—N/a	—N/a	—N/a	—N/a	—N/a	—N/a	—N/a	—N/a	—N/a	—N/a	—N/a	—N/a	—N/a	—N/a	—N/a	—N/a	—N/a	—N/a	—N/a	—N/a	—N/a
Khudawadi (69: 112B0–112FF)	—N/a	—N/a	—N/a	—N/a	—N/a	—N/a	—N/a	—N/a	—N/a	—N/a	—N/a	—N/a	—N/a	—N/a	—N/a	—N/a	—N/a	—N/a	—N/a	—N/a	—N/a	—N/a	—N/a	—N/a	—N/a	—N/a	—N/a	—N/a	—N/a	—N/a	—N/a
Grantha (85: 11300–1137F)	—N/a	—N/a	—N/a	—N/a	—N/a	—N/a	—N/a	—N/a	—N/a	—N/a	—N/a	—N/a	—N/a	—N/a	—N/a	—N/a	—N/a	—N/a	—N/a	—N/a	—N/a	—N/a	—N/a	—N/a	—N/a	—N/a	—N/a	—N/a	—N/a	—N/a	—N/a
Tirhuta (82: 11480–114DF)	—N/a	—N/a	—N/a	—N/a	—N/a	—N/a	—N/a	—N/a	—N/a	—N/a	—N/a	—N/a	—N/a	—N/a	—N/a	—N/a	—N/a	—N/a	—N/a	—N/a	—N/a	—N/a	—N/a	—N/a	—N/a	—N/a	—N/a	—N/a	—N/a	—N/a	—N/a
Siddham (92: 11580–115FF)	—N/a	—N/a	—N/a	—N/a	—N/a	—N/a	—N/a	—N/a	—N/a	—N/a	—N/a	—N/a	—N/a	—N/a	—N/a	—N/a	—N/a	—N/a	—N/a	—N/a	—N/a	—N/a	—N/a	—N/a	—N/a	—N/a	—N/a	—N/a	—N/a	—N/a	—N/a
Modi (79: 11600–1165F)	—N/a	—N/a	—N/a	—N/a	—N/a	—N/a	—N/a	—N/a	—N/a	—N/a	—N/a	—N/a	—N/a	—N/a	—N/a	—N/a	—N/a	—N/a	—N/a	—N/a	—N/a	—N/a	—N/a	—N/a	—N/a	—N/a	—N/a	—N/a	—N/a	—N/a	—N/a
Takri (66: 11680–116CF)	—N/a	—N/a	—N/a	—N/a	—N/a	—N/a	—N/a	—N/a	—N/a	—N/a	—N/a	—N/a	—N/a	—N/a	66	—N/a	—N/a	—N/a	—N/a	—N/a	—N/a	—N/a	—N/a	—N/a	—N/a	—N/a	—N/a	—N/a	—N/a	—N/a	—N/a
Ahom (57: 11700–1173F)	—N/a	—N/a	—N/a	—N/a	—N/a	—N/a	—N/a	—N/a	—N/a	—N/a	—N/a	—N/a	—N/a	—N/a	—N/a	—N/a	—N/a	—N/a	—N/a	—N/a	—N/a	—N/a	—N/a	—N/a	—N/a	—N/a	—N/a	—N/a	—N/a	—N/a	—N/a
Warang Citi (84: 118A0–118FF)	—N/a	—N/a	—N/a	—N/a	—N/a	—N/a	—N/a	—N/a	—N/a	—N/a	—N/a	—N/a	—N/a	—N/a	—N/a	—N/a	—N/a	—N/a	—N/a	—N/a	—N/a	—N/a	—N/a	—N/a	—N/a	—N/a	—N/a	—N/a	—N/a	—N/a	—N/a
Pau Cin Hau (57: 11AC0–11AFF)	—N/a	—N/a	—N/a	—N/a	—N/a	—N/a	—N/a	—N/a	—N/a	—N/a	—N/a	—N/a	—N/a	—N/a	—N/a	—N/a	—N/a	—N/a	—N/a	—N/a	—N/a	—N/a	—N/a	—N/a	—N/a	—N/a	—N/a	—N/a	—N/a	—N/a	—N/a
Cuneiform (Sumero-Akkadian Cuneiform) (922: 12000–123FF)	—N/a	—N/a	—N/a	—N/a	—N/a	6	—N/a	—N/a	—N/a	—N/a	—N/a	—N/a	—N/a	—N/a	—N/a	—N/a	—N/a	—N/a	—N/a	—N/a	—N/a	—N/a	—N/a	—N/a	—N/a	—N/a	—N/a	—N/a	—N/a	—N/a	—N/a
Cuneiform Numbers and Punctuation (116: 12400–1247F)	—N/a	—N/a	—N/a	—N/a	—N/a	—N/a	—N/a	—N/a	—N/a	—N/a	—N/a	—N/a	—N/a	—N/a	—N/a	—N/a	—N/a	—N/a	—N/a	—N/a	—N/a	—N/a	—N/a	—N/a	—N/a	—N/a	—N/a	—N/a	—N/a	—N/a	—N/a
Early Dynastic Cuneiform (196: 12480–1254F)	—N/a	—N/a	—N/a	—N/a	—N/a	—N/a	—N/a	—N/a	—N/a	—N/a	—N/a	—N/a	—N/a	—N/a	—N/a	—N/a	—N/a	—N/a	—N/a	—N/a	—N/a	—N/a	—N/a	—N/a	—N/a	—N/a	—N/a	—N/a	—N/a	—N/a	—N/a
Egyptian Hieroglyphs (1,071: 13000–1342F)	—N/a	—N/a	—N/a	—N/a	—N/a	—N/a	—N/a	—N/a	—N/a	—N/a	—N/a	—N/a	—N/a	—N/a	—N/a	—N/a	—N/a	—N/a	—N/a	—N/a	—N/a	—N/a	—N/a	—N/a	—N/a	—N/a	—N/a	—N/a	—N/a	—N/a	—N/a
Anatolian Hieroglyphs (583: 14400–1467F)	—N/a	—N/a	—N/a	—N/a	—N/a	—N/a	—N/a	—N/a	—N/a	—N/a	—N/a	—N/a	—N/a	—N/a	—N/a	—N/a	—N/a	—N/a	—N/a	—N/a	—N/a	—N/a	—N/a	—N/a	—N/a	—N/a	—N/a	—N/a	—N/a	—N/a	—N/a
Bamum Supplement (569: 16800–16A3F)	—N/a	—N/a	—N/a	—N/a	—N/a	—N/a	—N/a	—N/a	—N/a	—N/a	—N/a	—N/a	—N/a	—N/a	—N/a	—N/a	—N/a	—N/a	—N/a	—N/a	—N/a	—N/a	—N/a	—N/a	—N/a	—N/a	—N/a	—N/a	—N/a	—N/a	—N/a
Mro (43: 16A40–16A6F)	—N/a	—N/a	—N/a	—N/a	—N/a	—N/a	—N/a	—N/a	—N/a	—N/a	—N/a	—N/a	—N/a	—N/a	—N/a	—N/a	—N/a	—N/a	—N/a	—N/a	—N/a	—N/a	—N/a	—N/a	—N/a	—N/a	—N/a	—N/a	—N/a	—N/a	—N/a
Bassa Vah (36: 16AD0–16AFF)	—N/a	—N/a	—N/a	—N/a	—N/a	—N/a	—N/a	—N/a	—N/a	—N/a	—N/a	—N/a	—N/a	—N/a	—N/a	—N/a	—N/a	—N/a	—N/a	—N/a	—N/a	—N/a	—N/a	—N/a	—N/a	—N/a	—N/a	—N/a	—N/a	—N/a	—N/a
Pahawh Hmong (127: 16B00–16B8F)	—N/a	—N/a	—N/a	—N/a	—N/a	—N/a	—N/a	—N/a	—N/a	—N/a	—N/a	—N/a	—N/a	—N/a	—N/a	—N/a	—N/a	—N/a	—N/a	—N/a	—N/a	—N/a	—N/a	—N/a	—N/a	—N/a	—N/a	—N/a	—N/a	—N/a	—N/a
Miao (133: 16F00–16F9F)	—N/a	—N/a	—N/a	—N/a	—N/a	—N/a	—N/a	—N/a	—N/a	—N/a	—N/a	—N/a	—N/a	—N/a	133	—N/a	—N/a	—N/a	—N/a	—N/a	—N/a	—N/a	—N/a	—N/a	—N/a	—N/a	—N/a	—N/a	—N/a	—N/a	—N/a
Kana Supplement (2: 1B000–1B0FF)	—N/a	—N/a	—N/a	—N/a	—N/a	—N/a	—N/a	—N/a	—N/a	—N/a	—N/a	—N/a	—N/a	—N/a	2	—N/a	—N/a	—N/a	—N/a	—N/a	—N/a	—N/a	—N/a	—N/a	—N/a	—N/a	—N/a	—N/a	—N/a	—N/a	—N/a
Duployan (143: 1BC00–1BC9F)	—N/a	—N/a	—N/a	—N/a	—N/a	—N/a	—N/a	—N/a	—N/a	—N/a	—N/a	—N/a	—N/a	—N/a	—N/a	—N/a	—N/a	—N/a	—N/a	—N/a	—N/a	—N/a	—N/a	—N/a	—N/a	—N/a	—N/a	—N/a	—N/a	—N/a	—N/a
Shorthand Format Controls (4: 1BCA0–1BCAF)	—N/a	—N/a	—N/a	—N/a	—N/a	—N/a	—N/a	—N/a	—N/a	—N/a	—N/a	—N/a	—N/a	—N/a	—N/a	—N/a	—N/a	—N/a	—N/a	—N/a	—N/a	—N/a	—N/a	—N/a	—N/a	—N/a	—N/a	—N/a	—N/a	—N/a	—N/a
Byzantine Musical Symbols (246: 1D000–1D0FF)	—N/a	—N/a	—N/a	—N/a	—N/a	33	—N/a	—N/a	—N/a	—N/a	—N/a	—N/a	246	—N/a	246	—N/a	—N/a	—N/a	—N/a	—N/a	—N/a	—N/a	—N/a	—N/a	—N/a	—N/a	—N/a	—N/a	—N/a	—N/a	—N/a
Musical Symbols (231: 1D100–1D1FF)	—N/a	—N/a	—N/a	—N/a	—N/a	44	—N/a	—N/a	—N/a	—N/a	—N/a	—N/a	220	—N/a	220	—N/a	—N/a	—N/a	—N/a	—N/a	—N/a	—N/a	—N/a	—N/a	—N/a	—N/a	—N/a	—N/a	—N/a	—N/a	—N/a
Ancient Greek Musical Notation (70: 1D200–1D24F)	—N/a	—N/a	—N/a	70	—N/a	—N/a	—N/a	—N/a	—N/a	—N/a	—N/a	70	—N/a	—N/a	70	—N/a	—N/a	—N/a	—N/a	—N/a	—N/a	—N/a	90	—N/a	—N/a	—N/a	—N/a	—N/a	—N/a	—N/a	—N/a
Tai Xuan Jing Symbols (87: 1D300–1D35F)	—N/a	—N/a	—N/a	—N/a	—N/a	87	—N/a	—N/a	—N/a	87	—N/a	—N/a	—N/a	—N/a	87	—N/a	—N/a	—N/a	—N/a	—N/a	—N/a	—N/a	—N/a	—N/a	—N/a	87	—N/a	—N/a	—N/a	87	—N/a
Counting Rod Numerals (18: 1D360–1D371)	—N/a	—N/a	—N/a	—N/a	—N/a	18	—N/a	—N/a	—N/a	—N/a	—N/a	—N/a	—N/a	—N/a	18	—N/a	—N/a	—N/a	—N/a	—N/a	—N/a	—N/a	—N/a	—N/a	—N/a	—N/a	—N/a	—N/a	—N/a	18	—N/a
Mathematical Alphanumeric Symbols (996: 1D400–1D7FF)	—N/a	—N/a	—N/a	13	—N/a	—N/a	2	—N/a	—N/a	—N/a	2	—N/a	996	2	996	—N/a	—N/a	—N/a	—N/a	—N/a	—N/a	—N/a	—N/a	—N/a	—N/a	—N/a	—N/a	—N/a	—N/a	—N/a	—N/a
Sutton SignWriting (672: 1D800–1DAAF)	—N/a	—N/a	—N/a	—N/a	—N/a	—N/a	—N/a	—N/a	—N/a	—N/a	—N/a	—N/a	—N/a	—N/a	—N/a	—N/a	—N/a	—N/a	—N/a	—N/a	—N/a	—N/a	—N/a	—N/a	—N/a	—N/a	—N/a	—N/a	—N/a	—N/a	—N/a
Mende Kikakui (213: 1E800–1E8DF)	—N/a	—N/a	—N/a	—N/a	—N/a	—N/a	—N/a	—N/a	—N/a	—N/a	—N/a	—N/a	—N/a	—N/a	—N/a	—N/a	—N/a	—N/a	—N/a	—N/a	—N/a	—N/a	—N/a	—N/a	—N/a	—N/a	—N/a	—N/a	—N/a	—N/a	—N/a
Arabic Mathematical Alphabetic Symbols (143: 1EE00–1EEFF)	—N/a	—N/a	—N/a	—N/a	—N/a	—N/a	—N/a	—N/a	—N/a	—N/a	—N/a	—N/a	—N/a	—N/a	143	—N/a	—N/a	—N/a	—N/a	—N/a	—N/a	—N/a	—N/a	—N/a	—N/a	—N/a	—N/a	—N/a	—N/a	—N/a	—N/a
Mahjong Tiles (44: 1F000–1F02F)	—N/a	—N/a	—N/a	—N/a	—N/a	—N/a	—N/a	—N/a	—N/a	—N/a	—N/a	—N/a	44	—N/a	44	—N/a	—N/a	—N/a	—N/a	—N/a	—N/a	—N/a	—N/a	—N/a	—N/a	—N/a	—N/a	—N/a	—N/a	—N/a	—N/a
Domino Tiles (100: 1F030–1F09F)	—N/a	—N/a	—N/a	—N/a	—N/a	—N/a	—N/a	—N/a	—N/a	—N/a	—N/a	—N/a	100	—N/a	100	—N/a	—N/a	—N/a	—N/a	—N/a	—N/a	—N/a	—N/a	—N/a	—N/a	—N/a	—N/a	—N/a	—N/a	—N/a	—N/a
Playing Cards (82: 1F0A0–1F0FF)	—N/a	—N/a	—N/a	—N/a	—N/a	—N/a	—N/a	—N/a	—N/a	—N/a	—N/a	—N/a	—N/a	—N/a	59	—N/a	—N/a	—N/a	—N/a	—N/a	—N/a	—N/a	—N/a	—N/a	—N/a	—N/a	—N/a	—N/a	—N/a	—N/a	—N/a
Enclosed Alphanumeric Supplement (173: 1F100–1F1FF)	—N/a	—N/a	—N/a	—N/a	—N/a	—N/a	—N/a	—N/a	—N/a	—N/a	—N/a	—N/a	—N/a	—N/a	171	—N/a	—N/a	—N/a	—N/a	—N/a	—N/a	—N/a	—N/a	—N/a	—N/a	—N/a	—N/a	—N/a	—N/a	—N/a	—N/a
Enclosed Ideographic Supplement (57: 1F200–1F2FF)	—N/a	—N/a	—N/a	—N/a	—N/a	—N/a	—N/a	—N/a	—N/a	—N/a	—N/a	—N/a	—N/a	—N/a	57	—N/a	—N/a	—N/a	—N/a	—N/a	—N/a	—N/a	—N/a	—N/a	—N/a	—N/a	—N/a	—N/a	—N/a	—N/a	—N/a
Miscellaneous Symbols and Pictographs (766: 1F300–1F5FF)	—N/a	—N/a	—N/a	—N/a	—N/a	—N/a	—N/a	—N/a	—N/a	—N/a	—N/a	—N/a	—N/a	—N/a	533	—N/a	—N/a	—N/a	—N/a	—N/a	—N/a	—N/a	—N/a	—N/a	—N/a	—N/a	—N/a	—N/a	—N/a	—N/a	—N/a
Emoticons (80: 1F600–1F64F)	—N/a	—N/a	—N/a	—N/a	—N/a	—N/a	—N/a	—N/a	—N/a	—N/a	—N/a	—N/a	—N/a	—N/a	76	—N/a	—N/a	—N/a	—N/a	—N/a	—N/a	—N/a	—N/a	—N/a	—N/a	—N/a	—N/a	—N/a	—N/a	—N/a	—N/a
Ornamental Dingbats (48: 1F650–1F67F)	—N/a	—N/a	—N/a	—N/a	—N/a	—N/a	—N/a	—N/a	—N/a	—N/a	—N/a	—N/a	—N/a	—N/a	—N/a	—N/a	—N/a	—N/a	—N/a	—N/a	—N/a	—N/a	—N/a	—N/a	—N/a	—N/a	—N/a	—N/a	—N/a	—N/a	—N/a
Transport and Map Symbols (98: 1F680–1F6FF)	—N/a	—N/a	—N/a	—N/a	—N/a	—N/a	—N/a	—N/a	—N/a	—N/a	—N/a	—N/a	—N/a	—N/a	70	—N/a	—N/a	—N/a	—N/a	—N/a	—N/a	—N/a	—N/a	—N/a	—N/a	—N/a	—N/a	—N/a	—N/a	—N/a	—N/a
Alchemical Symbols (116: 1F700–1F77F)	—N/a	—N/a	—N/a	—N/a	—N/a	—N/a	—N/a	—N/a	—N/a	—N/a	—N/a	—N/a	—N/a	—N/a	116	—N/a	—N/a	—N/a	—N/a	—N/a	—N/a	—N/a	—N/a	—N/a	—N/a	—N/a	—N/a	—N/a	—N/a	—N/a	—N/a
Geometric Shapes Extended (85: 1F780–1F7FF)	—N/a	—N/a	—N/a	—N/a	—N/a	—N/a	—N/a	—N/a	—N/a	—N/a	—N/a	—N/a	—N/a	—N/a	—N/a	—N/a	—N/a	—N/a	—N/a	—N/a	—N/a	—N/a	—N/a	—N/a	—N/a	—N/a	—N/a	—N/a	—N/a	—N/a	—N/a
Supplemental Arrows-C (148: 1F800–1F8FF)	—N/a	—N/a	—N/a	—N/a	—N/a	—N/a	—N/a	—N/a	—N/a	—N/a	—N/a	—N/a	—N/a	—N/a	—N/a	—N/a	—N/a	—N/a	—N/a	—N/a	—N/a	—N/a	—N/a	—N/a	—N/a	—N/a	—N/a	—N/a	—N/a	—N/a	—N/a
Supplemental Symbols and Pictographs (15: 1F900–1F9FF)	—N/a	—N/a	—N/a	—N/a	—N/a	—N/a	—N/a	—N/a	—N/a	—N/a	—N/a	—N/a	—N/a	—N/a	—N/a	—N/a	—N/a	—N/a	—N/a	—N/a	—N/a	—N/a	—N/a	—N/a	—N/a	—N/a	—N/a	—N/a	—N/a	—N/a	—N/a
Range Font	Arial	Arial Unicode MS	Bitstream Cyberbit	Cardo	Caslon Roman	Code2001	Charis SIL	Chrysanthi Unicode	ClearlyU	DejaVu Fonts	Doulos SIL	Everson Mono	GNU FreeFont	Gentium Plus	GNU Unifont	Junicode	Linux Libertine	Lucida Grande	Lucida Sans Unicode	Microsoft JhengHei	Microsoft Sans Serif	MPH 2B Damase	New Athena Unicode	New Gulim	STIXGeneral	Sun-ExtB	Tahoma	Times New Roman	TITUS Cyberbit Basic	WenQuanYi Zen Hei	Y.OzFontN
SMP (Plane 1)

== List of SIP Unicode fonts ==
List of Unicode fonts supporting SIP characters
Font	Char(s)	Glyphs	Kernpairs (Standard)^{‡}	Range(Point): Hinting/ Smoothing Behavior	Version & Date	Filename, Size	Font Family	Font Weight, style	Font type	Serif style	License	Creator / Author (Copyright)	Notes
Code2002	20,419	30,469	0	0~5: Smoothed. 6~6: Hinted. 7+: Hinted & Smoothed.	v0.917 sfnt rev 0.916992; 2005-04-04	CODE2002.TTF (4.09 MB)	Code2002	Medium (Normal), Book, Regular	TTF	Normal Sans	Freeware	James Kass	More info.

=== 20000–2FFFF ===
Unicode blocks listed are valid for Unicode version 8.0.

SIP (Plane 2)
Font Range	Arial	Arial Unicode MS	Bitstream Cyberbit	Cardo	Caslon Roman	Code2001	Code2002	Charis SIL	Chrysanthi Unicode	ClearlyU	DejaVu Fonts	Doulos SIL	Everson Mono	GNU FreeFont	Gentium	GNU Unifont	Junicode	Linux Libertine	Lucida Grande	Lucida Sans Unicode	Microsoft JhengHei	Microsoft Sans Serif	New Gulim	Sun-ExtB	Tahoma	Times New Roman	TITUS Cyberbit Basic	WenQuanYi Zen Hei	Y.OzFontN
Total Characters in SIP (53,386: 20000–2FFFF)	—N/a	—N/a	—N/a	—N/a	—N/a	12	20,158	—N/a	—N/a	—N/a	—N/a	—N/a	—N/a	—N/a	—N/a	—N/a	—N/a	—N/a	—N/a	—N/a	—N/a	—N/a	—N/a	43,253	—N/a	—N/a	—N/a	543	387
CJK Unified Ideographs Extension B (42,711: 20000-2A6D6)	—N/a	—N/a	—N/a	—N/a	—N/a	12	20,158	—N/a	—N/a	—N/a	—N/a	—N/a	—N/a	—N/a	—N/a	—N/a	—N/a	—N/a	—N/a	—N/a	—N/a	—N/a	—N/a	42,711	—N/a	—N/a	—N/a	1	342
CJK Unified Ideographs Extension C (4,149: 2A700-2B734)	—N/a	—N/a	—N/a	—N/a	—N/a	—N/a	—N/a	—N/a	—N/a	—N/a	—N/a	—N/a	—N/a	—N/a	—N/a	—N/a	—N/a	—N/a	—N/a	—N/a	—N/a	—N/a	—N/a	—N/a	—N/a	—N/a	—N/a	—N/a	—N/a
CJK Unified Ideographs Extension D (222: 2B740-2B81D)	—N/a	—N/a	—N/a	—N/a	—N/a	—N/a	—N/a	—N/a	—N/a	—N/a	—N/a	—N/a	—N/a	—N/a	—N/a	—N/a	—N/a	—N/a	—N/a	—N/a	—N/a	—N/a	—N/a	—N/a	—N/a	—N/a	—N/a	—N/a	—N/a
CJK Unified Ideographs Extension E (5,762: 2B820-2CEAF)	—N/a	—N/a	—N/a	—N/a	—N/a	—N/a	—N/a	—N/a	—N/a	—N/a	—N/a	—N/a	—N/a	—N/a	—N/a	—N/a	—N/a	—N/a	—N/a	—N/a	—N/a	—N/a	—N/a	—N/a	—N/a	—N/a	—N/a	—N/a	—N/a
CJK Compatibility Ideographs Supplement (542: 2F800-2FA1F)	—N/a	—N/a	—N/a	—N/a	—N/a	—N/a	—N/a	—N/a	—N/a	—N/a	—N/a	—N/a	—N/a	—N/a	—N/a	—N/a	—N/a	—N/a	—N/a	—N/a	—N/a	—N/a	—N/a	542	—N/a	—N/a	—N/a	542	44
SIP (Plane 2)

== List of SSP Unicode fonts ==
=== E0000–EFFFF ===
Unicode blocks listed are valid for Unicode version 8.0.

SSP (Plane 14; 0E_{hexadecimal})
Font Range	Arial	Arial Unicode MS	Bitstream Cyberbit	Cardo	Caslon Roman	Code2001	Charis SIL	Chrysanthi Unicode	ClearlyU	DejaVu Fonts	Doulos SIL	Everson Mono	GNU FreeFont	Gentium	GNU Unifont	Junicode	Linux Libertine	Lucida Grande	Lucida Sans Unicode	Microsoft JhengHei	Microsoft Sans Serif	New Gulim	Sun-ExtA	Tahoma	Times New Roman	TITUS Cyberbit Basic	WenQuanYi Zen Hei	Y.OzFontN
Total Characters in SSP (337: E0000–EFFFF)	—N/a	—N/a	—N/a	—N/a	—N/a	12	—N/a	—N/a	—N/a	—N/a	—N/a	—N/a	—N/a	—N/a	337	—N/a	—N/a	—N/a	—N/a	—N/a	—N/a	—N/a	—N/a	—N/a	—N/a	—N/a	—N/a	16
Tags (97: E0000–E007F)	—N/a	—N/a	—N/a	—N/a	—N/a	12	—N/a	—N/a	—N/a	—N/a	—N/a	—N/a	—N/a	—N/a	97	—N/a	—N/a	—N/a	—N/a	—N/a	—N/a	—N/a	—N/a	—N/a	—N/a	—N/a	—N/a	—N/a
Variation Selectors Supplement (240: E0100–E01EF)	—N/a	—N/a	—N/a	—N/a	—N/a	—N/a	—N/a	—N/a	—N/a	—N/a	—N/a	—N/a	—N/a	—N/a	240	—N/a	—N/a	—N/a	—N/a	—N/a	—N/a	—N/a	—N/a	—N/a	—N/a	—N/a	—N/a	—N/a
SSP (Plane 14; 0E_{hexadecimal})

== See also ==
- Alt code
- Calligraphy
- Comparison of Unicode encodings
- Code page
- Enabling complex text support for Indic scripts
- Fallback font
- Font management software
- HTML
- Input method
  - List of input methods for Unix platforms
    - Chinese input methods for computers
    - Japanese input method
    - Korean language and computers
- Keyboard layout
- List of CJK fonts
- List of Unicode fonts
- Open-source Unicode typefaces
- Foundries
- Typographic unit
- Unicode Consortium
