= Unihan font =

Unihan font is a bitmap typeface developed by Ross Paterson in 1993.

The font consists of two bitmap fonts with sizes 16×16 and 24×24. These covered most of the CJK Auxiliary and Unihan portions of Unicode 1.1. The font files were in the HBF, BIN, and BDF formats. The bitmaps were derived from fonts supporting the GB 2312, Big5, JIS X 0208, KSC 5601 (now called KS X 1001) or CCCII encodings.

== See also ==
- List of typefaces (List of fonts)
- Unicode typefaces

== Endnotes ==
- README on unihan16.hbf, unihan24.hbf font by Ross Paterson. (at ibiblio.org).
