= Linux Libertine =

Typeface

- Category: Serif
- Classification: Garalde old-style
- Designer: Philipp H. Poll
- Foundry: Libertine Open Fonts Project
- Date released: September 23, 2003; 22 years ago
- Characters: 2,673
- Glyphs: 2,676
- License: GPL / OFL
- Shown here: Version 5.3.0
- Website: linuxlibertine.sourceforge.net github.com/libertine-fonts/libertine/ sourceforge.net/projects/linuxlibertine/
- Latest release version: 5.3.0
- Latest release date: July 6, 2012; 14 years ago

Linux Biolinum
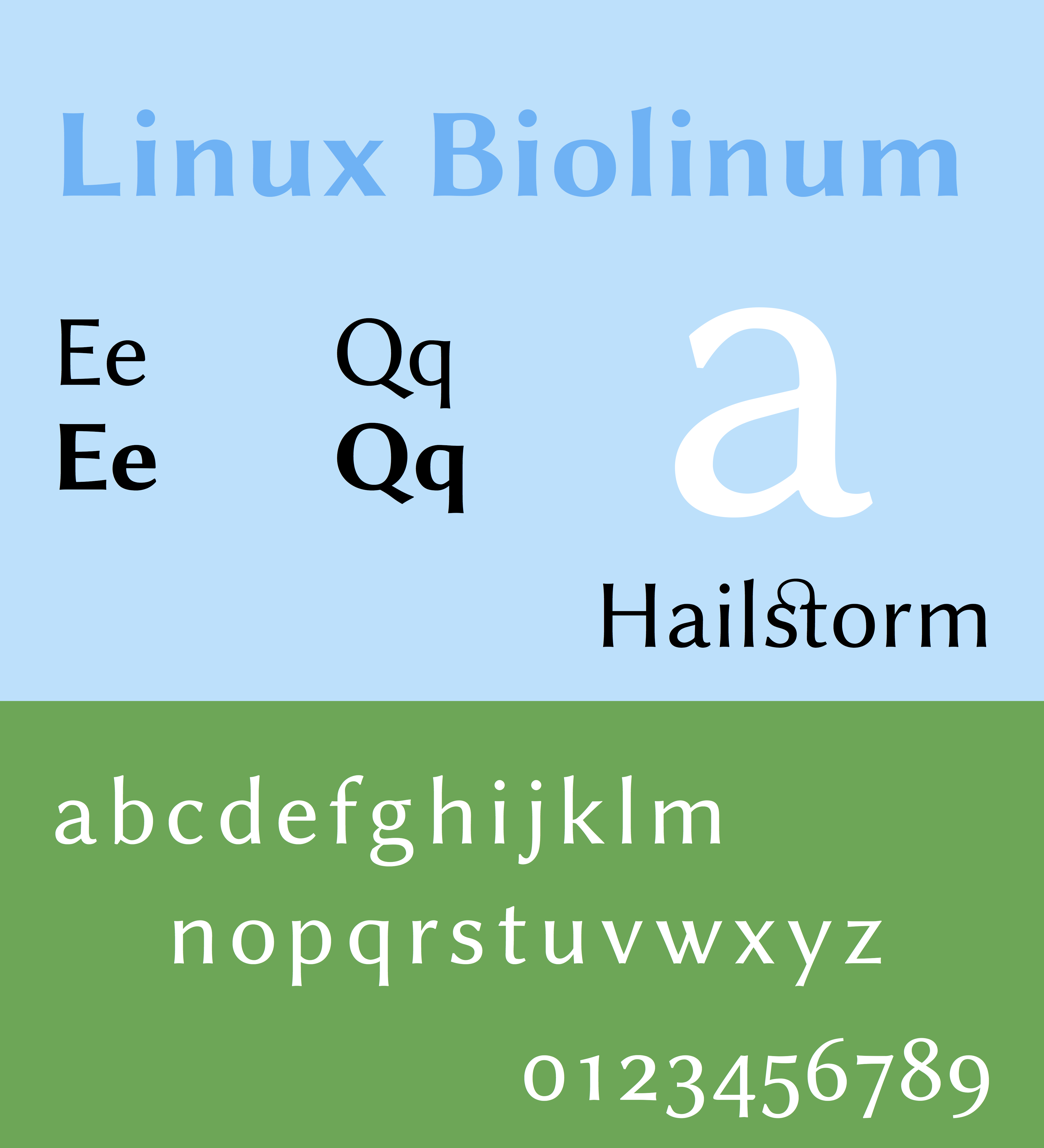
- Category: Sans-serif
- Classification: Humanist
- Designer: Philipp H. Poll
- Foundry: Libertine Open Fonts Project
- Date released: March 21, 2009; 17 years ago
- Characters: 2,400
- Glyphs: 2,403
- License: GPL / OFL
- Sample
- Shown here: Version 5.3.0
- Latest release version: 5.3.0
- Latest release date: February 2, 2016; 10 years ago

Linux Libertine is a typeface released in 2003 by the Libertine Open Fonts Project, which aims to create free and open alternatives to proprietary typefaces such as Times New Roman. It was developed with the free font editor FontForge and is licensed under the GNU General Public License and the SIL Open Font License.

In 2009, the project released Linux Biolinum: it is a sans serif font designed to pair well with Libertine. It resembles Optima.

In 2012, a monospaced serif font face was released, Linux Libertine Mono.

== Characteristics ==
Linux Libertine is a proportional serif typeface inspired by 19th century book type and is intended as an alternative to the Times font family.

The typeface has five styles: regular, bold, italic, bold italic, and small capitals, all of which are available in TrueType and OpenType format, as well as in source code. The OpenType version allows automatic positioning and substitution, including true fractions, ligatures and kerning. A display type variant, while similar in letter form, is lighter in weight and bears a closer resemblance to old-style types such as Palatino.

There is also a complementary humanist sans-serif face, Linux Biolinum, similar to Optima or Candara. It is available in bold and italic styles.

== Unicode coverage ==
Linux Libertine contains more than 2,000 glyphs and encompasses character sets such as the Greek Alphabet, Cyrillic script, and Hebrew alphabet. Additionally, it offers several ligatures (such as f‌f, f‌i, and c‌t, and the capital ß). It also includes special characters such as International Phonetic Alphabet, arrows, floral symbols, Roman numbers, text figures, and small caps. The Tux mascot is included at the Unicode Private Use Area code point U+E000.

== Usage ==
The Wikipedia wordmark in small caps

In 2010, Linux Libertine was adopted as an open-source substitute for the Hoefler Text typeface in the redesign of the Wikipedia logo, making it possible to localize the Wikipedia identity into more than 250 languages and character sets. The "W" character, which had previously been used in various other places in Wikipedia (such as the favicon) and was a "distinctive part of the Wikipedia brand", had "crossed" V glyphs in the original logo, while Linux Libertine has a joined W letter shape. As a solution, the "crossed" W was added to Linux Libertine as an OpenType variant.

Both the Linux Libertine and Linux Biolinum typefaces are used by the open-source design publication Libre Graphics Magazine and the Association for Computing Machinery journals and conference proceedings.

== Derivative works ==
László Németh created a variant of fonts with additional Graphite font tables: Linux Libertine G and Linux Biolinum G. Both these fonts are bundled with LibreOffice as of the suite's 3.3 release, with some features added in the 3.5 release.

Khaled Hosny forked the Linux Libertine font family in 2012 that stemmed from a lack of a matching mathematical companion font for Linux Libertine. He officially released the initial version of his fork in 2016. Due to licensing restrictions of Linux Libertine regarding the need to change the name of derivative works, he renamed his version to Libertinus (including Libertinus Serif and Libertinus Sans). Hosny also used this opportunity to unify the various font names. Thus, Linux Libertine became Libertinus Serif, Linux Biolinum became Libertinus Sans, and Linux Libertine Mono became Libertinus Mono. His new mathematical font is called Libertinus Math. While working on the mathematical companion, Hosny fixed many technical issues of the already existing fonts. This led him to a complete fork of Linux Libertine, not just adding a complementing typeface to it. Since Linux Libertine's releases came to a halt in 2012, the actively developed Libertinus fonts are de facto a continuation of the now stalled Linux Libertine project. Khaled passed the role of maintainer on to Caleb Maclennan in 2020.

Stefan Peev forked the Libertinus Serif font to create the Common Serif font in 2022.

== See also ==
- Open-source Unicode typefaces
- List of typefaces
- Unicode font
