= TITUS (project) =

Collection of Indo-Europeanist works

TITUS (German: Thesaurus Indogermanischer Text- und Sprachmaterialien 'Thesaurus of Indo-European Texts and Languages') is a project of Johann Wolfgang Goethe University in Frankfurt am Main, maintained by Professor Dr. Jost Gippert, it aimed to collect information about Indo-European languages, and to improve collaboration between scholars.

The project aims to assist computer-related studies and to collect dictionaries, word lists, tools for linguistic analyses, etc. All contributors are given access to the materials, and some of the files can be accessed freely.

== Resources ==
The project provides a Unicode 4.0 font (TITUS Cyberbit Basic) and keyboard map for non-commercial purposes to match the requirements of linguists and philologists working on several languages (ancient and modern).
