= Bitstream Cyberbit =

Serif typeface

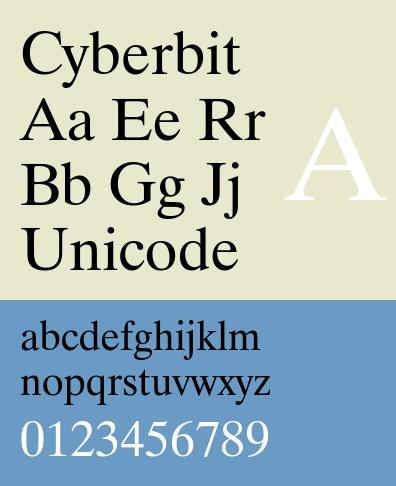
- Category: Serif
- Foundry: Bitstream Inc.
- Design based on: Times New Roman

Bitstream Cyberbit is a commercial serif font designed by Bitstream Inc. It is freeware for non-commercial uses. It was one of the first widely available fonts to support a large portion of the Unicode repertoire as it stood at the time.

Cyberbit was developed by Bitstream to provide Unicode Consortium members with a large Unicode-encoded font to use for testing and development purposes. The font has 32,910 characters (29,934 glyphs) and 935 kerning pairs in v2.0 beta. The related Bitstream Cyberbase font includes a much smaller number of characters, with 1,249 glyphs and 935 kerning pairs in v1.0 beta.

Bitstream no longer offers Cyberbit as a free download or retail product.

== TITUS Cyberbit ==
TITUS Cyberbit
- Category: Serif
- Foundry: Bitstream Inc., TITUS

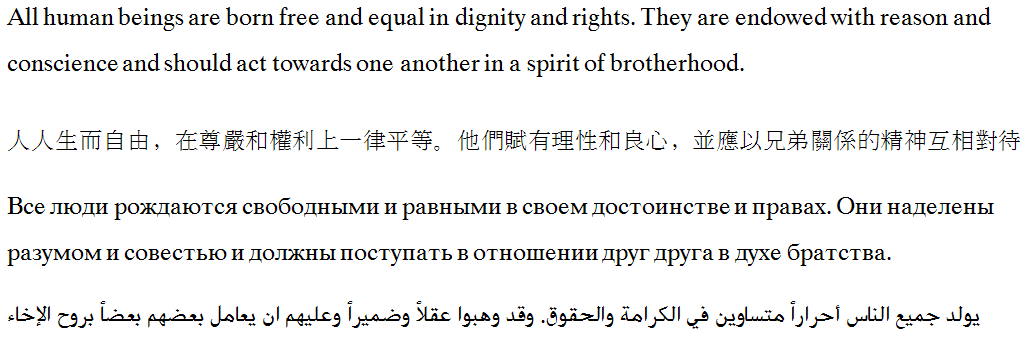
A sample of Cyberbit characters

The Chinese character 齉 nàng in Cyberbit

The Greek character Omega in Cyberbit

TITUS Cyberbit Basic is a typeface derived from the Bitstream Cyberbit family, designed by Bitstream Inc. and the TITUS project for Unicode 4.0. Jost Gippert and Carl-Martin Bunz were the principal developers. It can be obtained for free from TITUS and is freeware for non-commercial uses.

TITUS Cyberbit Basic supports part of the Medieval Unicode Font Initiative, and it includes 10,044 glyphs (9,341 characters) in version 3.0 (2000) (revision 4.0) from the following Unicode blocks:

- Basic Latin (95)
- Latin-1 Supplement (96)
- Latin Extended-A (128)
- Latin Extended-B (183)
- IPA Extensions (96)
- Spacing Modifier Letters (80)
- Combining Diacritical Marks (106)
- Greek (128)
- Cyrillic (247)
- Cyrillic Supplement (16)
- Armenian (86)
- Hebrew (83)
- Arabic (185)
- Syriac (76)
- Thaana (50)
- Devanagari (106)
- Thai (87)
- Georgian (83)
- Ethiopic (364)
- Ogham (32)
- Runic (81)
- Phonetic Extensions (108)
- Latin Extended Additional (247)
- Greek Extended (236)
- General Punctuation (68)
- Superscripts and Subscripts (29)
- Currency Symbols (12)
- Letterlike Symbols (13)
- Number Forms (28)
- Arrows (21)
- Mathematical Operators (80)
- Miscellaneous Technical (8)
- Enclosed Alphanumerics (112)
- Box Drawing (112)
- Block Elements (10)
- Geometric Shapes (53)
- Miscellaneous Symbols (33)
- Glagolitic (94)
- Coptic (114)
- Georgian Supplement (38)
- CJK Symbols and Punctuation (31)
- Hiragana (90)
- Katakana (94)
- Bopomofo (37)
- Private Use Area (4,649)
- CJK Compatibility Ideographs (1)
- Alphabetic Presentation Forms (57)
- Arabic Presentation Forms-A (205)
- CJK Compatibility Forms (27)
- Small Form Variants (29)
- Arabic Presentation Forms-B (140)
- Halfwidth and Fullwidth Forms (157)

An extended version of this font is TITUS Cyberbit Unicode, which includes 36,161 characters in v4.0.

== See also ==
- Bitstream Speedo Fonts – Obsolete scalable font format
- Bitstream Vera – Typeface series from Bitstream
- List of typefaces
- TITUS (project) – Collection of Indo-Europeanist works
- Unicode typefaces – Computer font that maps glyphs to code points defined in the Unicode Standard
