= WenQuanYi =

- Original author: Qianqian Fang
- Developer: WenQuanYi Project Contributors
- Release: October 2004; 22 years ago
- Type: Computer font
- License: GPL
- Website: wenq.org

WenQuanYi (simplified Chinese: 文泉驿; traditional Chinese: 文泉驛; pinyin: Wénquányì; aka: Spring of Letters) is an open-source project of Chinese computer fonts licensed under GNU General Public License.

== General ==
WenQuanYi project was started by Qianqian Fang (Screen name: FangQ; Chinese: 房骞骞), a Chinese biomedical imaging researcher at the Massachusetts General Hospital, in October, 2004.

The fonts of the WenQuanYi project are now included with the Linux distributions Ubuntu, Fedora, Slackware, Magic Linux and CDLinux. Debian, Gentoo, Mandriva, Arch Linux and Frugalware offer the sources for WenQuanYi fonts. The fonts are among the Chinese fonts officially supported by Wikimedia.

WenQuanYi's website is using Habitat, a Wiki software derived from UseModWiki by Qianqian Fang. It is allowed to create or modify the glyphs online.

== Fonts ==
WenQuanYi project aims to create high-quality open-source bitmap and outline fonts for all CJK characters. It includes Zen Hei (Regular, Mono and Sharp), Micro Hei (Regular and Mono), Bitmap Song and Unibit font. As of version 0.8.38, the WenQuanYi Zen Hei font covers more than 35,000 glyphs.

Font family	Initial release	Latest stable release	Serif?	Bitmap?	Monospace?	License	Chars	Glyphs	Format	Page	Sample
Zen Hei	September 15, 2007; 19 years ago	0.9.45 (Fighting-state RC1) (March 12, 2010; 16 years ago) [±]	Sans	No	No	GPL 2			TTC		
Zen Hei Mono	September 15, 2007; 19 years ago	0.9.45 (Fighting-state RC1) (March 12, 2010; 16 years ago) [±]	Sans	No	Yes	GPL 2			TTC		
Zen Hei Sharp	September 15, 2007; 19 years ago	0.9.45 (Fighting-state RC1) (March 12, 2010; 16 years ago) [±]	Sans	No (Note: Using Bitmap Song for 11-16px; using Zen Hei for other font size.)	No	GPL 2			TTC		
Micro Hei	May 25, 2009; 17 years ago	0.2.0 beta (BigBang) (Note: Only beta versions available for WenQuanYi Micro Hei.) (May 25, 2009; 17 years ago) [±]	Sans	No	No	Apache 2 / GPL 3			TTC		
Micro Hei Mono	May 25, 2009; 17 years ago	0.2.0 beta (BigBang) (May 25, 2009; 17 years ago) [±]	Sans	No	Yes	Apache 2 / GPL 3			TTC		
Bitmap Song	June 25, 2005; 21 years ago	0.9.9 (Hero) (November 4, 2007; 18 years ago) [±]	Song	Yes (only 11-16px)	No	GPL 2			Multi-strike Bitmap Font		
Unibit	May 25, 2009; 17 years ago	1.1.0 (September 14, 2007; 19 years ago) [±]	Sans	Yes	Yes	GPL 2			Multi-strike Bitmap Font		

=== Zen Hei ===
WenQuanYi Zen Hei (文泉驿正黑), WenQuanYi Zen Hei Mono (文泉驿等宽正黑) and WenQuanYi Zen Hei Sharp (文泉驿点阵正黑) co-exist in a single TTC file. They are also with embedded bitmaps. The Latin/Hangul characters are derived from UnDotum, Bopomofo are from cwTeX, mono-spaced Latin are from M+ M2 Light. These fonts have full CJK coverage. The font package is included with Fedora and Ubuntu.

=== Micro Hei ===
WenQuanYi Micro Hei (文泉驿微米黑), WenQuanYi Micro Hei Mono (文泉驿等宽微米黑) are derived from the Droid Sans font (merged with Droid Sans Fallback) and readable in compact sizes. The primitive motivation of this project was to extend Droid Sans Fallback's glyph coverage. Since the GB 18030 compatible Droid Sans Fallback font's release, the Micro Hei project has been de facto inactive.

Unlike Zen Hei, which is drawn stroke-by-stroke, Micro Hei and its predecessor Droid Sans are created by combining radical components using TrueType references. The main goal is a reduced file size, hence "Micro".

=== Bitmap Song ===
WenQuanYi Bitmap Song (文泉驿点阵宋体) has full coverage to GB 18030 Hanzi at 11-16px (9pt-12pt) font sizes.

=== Unibit ===
WenQuanYi Unibit (文泉驿Unibit) adopted the GNU Unifont's scheme of 8x16 and 16x16 glyphs. Then the contributors added 10,000 more glyphs. The improvements done by WenQuanYi Unibit has been merged back to GNU Unifont.

== Glyph ==
The glyph of traditional characters included in WenQuanYi is the new character form of the mainland China. The glyph comes from G-Source (character source from mainland China) of Unicode and the standard of a character list from the 1988 List of Commonly Used Characters in Modern Chinese and the 2009 List of Commonly Used Standard Chinese Characters.

The glyph is not from T-Source (character source from Taiwan) and H-Source (character source from Hong Kong). It does not conform with the standardized traditional character writing behavior of writers from Taiwan and Hong Kong. In other words, it does not support the traditional Chinese character set. (For more information, see Han unification.)

Some examples of characters with different glyph are: 別, 吳, 骨, 角, 過, 這, 草, 放, etc.

== See also ==
- Unicode fonts
- List of CJK fonts
