= New Gulim =

Korean typeface

New Gulim (새굴림)
- Gulim fonts in 3 colors.
- Category: Sans-serif
- Designer(s): HanYang System Co., Ltd.
- Foundry: HanYang System Co., Ltd.

New Gulim (새굴림/SaeGulRim) is a sans-serif type Unicode font designed especially for the Korean-language script, designed by HanYang System Co., Limited (now Hanyang Information & Communications Co., Ltd). It is an expanded version of Hanyang Gulrim (한양 굴림).

Font is hinted at 0–13 points, hinted and smoothed at 14 points or higher.

It contains 49,284 glyphs in v3.10. This font was part of Old Korean support tools for MS Word 2000 and 2003.

It covers following ranges: Basic Latin, Latin-1 Supplement, Latin Extended-A, Spacing Modifier Letters, Greek, Cyrillic, Hangul Jamo, General Punctuation, Letterlike Symbols, Number Forms, Arrows, Mathematical Operators, Enclosed Alphanumerics, Box Drawing, Geometric Shapes, Miscellaneous Symbols, CJK Symbols and Punctuation, Hiragana, Katakana, Hangul Compatibility Jamo, Enclosed CJK Letters and Months, CJK Compatibility, CJK Unified Ideographs Extension A, CJK Unified Ideographs, Hangul Syllables, CJK Compatibility Ideographs, Halfwidth and Fullwidth Forms. It basically extended the Gulim font to support all glyphs in CJK Unified Ideographs Extension A, CJK Unified Ideographs (up to Unicode 3.0), and miscellaneous glyph updates, with slight change in font metrics.

In the Private Use Area (E000–F8FF), it includes about 5000 precomposed pre-1933 orthography Korean syllables, small form variants of Hangul Jamo, some small hanja glyphs in regular script.

The font was once available as part of Microsoft Old Hangul Support Pack.

== Gulim Old Hangul Jamo ==
Included with New Gulim in Old Hangul Support Pack is Gulim Old Hangul Jamo (굴림 옛한글 자모/GulRim YesHanGeul JaMo) font, which contains only Basic Latin, Hangul, and old Hangul glyphs found in New Gulim font. The old Hangul glyphs, and small form variants of Hangul glyphs that are in the PUA of New Gulim font are moved to CJK Unified Ideographs block. Only seven glyphs in the Hangul Syllables block of New Gulim are retained in their original code points in Gulim Old Hangul Jamo.

This font does not have hinting. It only supports code page 949.

== See also ==
- List of CJK fonts
- List of typefaces
- Unicode fonts
