= Bitstream Vera =

Typeface series from Bitstream

Vera Sans
- Category: Sans-serif
- Classification: Humanist
- Designer: Jim Lyles
- Foundry: Bitstream Inc.
- Date created: 2001
- License: Commercial; open-source
- Also known as: Bera

Vera is a digital typeface (computer font) superfamily with a liberal license. It was designed by Jim Lyles from the now-defunct Bitstream Inc. type foundry, and it is closely based on Bitstream Prima, for which Lyles was also responsible. It is a TrueType font with full hinting instructions, which improve its rendering quality on low-resolution devices such as computer monitors. The font has also been repackaged as a Type 1 PostScript font, called Bera, for LaTeX users.

Vera consists of serif, sans-serif, and monospace fonts. The Bitstream Vera Sans Mono typeface in particular is suitable for technical work, as it clearly distinguishes "l" (lowercase L) from "1" (one) and "I" (uppercase i), and "0" (zero) from "O" (uppercase o), in similar fashion as Verdana and Tahoma fonts.

Bitstream Vera Sans is also the default font used by the Python library Matplotlib to produce plots.

== Unicode coverage ==
Bitstream Vera itself covers Basic Latin and Latin 1-Supplement letters. It comprises only 300 glyphs.

== Licensing and expansion ==
Bitstream Vera was released in 2003 with generous licensing terms and minimal restrictions that are nearly identical to those found in the Open Font License, which was not formalized until two years later. The main restrictions were a prohibition on reselling the fonts as a standalone product (though selling as part of a software package is acceptable), and that any derivative fonts not be distributed under the name "Vera" or use the Bitstream trademark.

The DejaVu fonts are a prominent expansion of the Bitstream Vera fonts.

Variants of Bitstream Vera

Comparison between Helvetica, Arial, and Bitstream Vera, three common sans-serif typefaces

== See also ==
- Bitstream Cyberbit
- Bitstream Speedo Fonts
- DejaVu fonts
- List of typefaces
- Menlo (typeface)
- TITUS Cyberbit Basic
