= Gentium =

- Category: Serif
- Classification: Old-style
- Designer: Victor Gaultney
- Date created: 2001
- Date released: 2002-09-16 (Gentium 1.00)
- Characters: 2,780
- Glyphs: 4,500 (double counting glyphs used for multiple characters)
- License: Open Font License
- Variations: All variants were unified in version 7. Previously: Gentium Basic; Gentium Book Basic; Gentium Plus; Gentium Book Plus; Gentium Plus Compact
- Sample
- Website: software.sil.org/gentium/
- Latest release version: 7.00
- Latest release date: June 1, 2025; 13 months ago

Gentium (/ˈdʒɛntiəm/, from the Latin for "of the nations") is a Unicode serif typeface family designed by Victor Gaultney. Gentium fonts are free and open source software, and are released under the SIL Open Font License (OFL), which permits modification and redistribution. Gentium has nearly universal support for modern languages using the Latin, Greek, and Cyrillic scripts, as well as the International Phonetic Alphabet (IPA) and other phonetic notation, excepting mostly paleographic and medievalist characters. Gentium includes over 4,600 glyphs and advanced typographic features through OpenType and formerly Graphite.

Gentium was designed for use at 10 to 11 points. Wide counters and low stroke contrast improve readability at small point sizes. Long ascenders allow diacritics stacking. In 2003, the Gentium font was awarded a Certificate of Excellence in Type Design from the Association Typographique Internationale (ATypI) as one of the best designs of the previous five years.

== History ==
The original release of Gentium had roman and italic typefaces. It included 1,700 glyphs, with 1,500 characters covering most of the Latin range defined by Unicode at the time, as well as monotonic and polytonic Greek, which were designed to flow in harmony with the Latin. The roman typeface included basic Cyrillic.

=== GentiumAlt ===
Early releases of Gentium came with a variant called GentiumAlt ("Gentium Alternative"), which contained flatter diacritics intended to improve the appearance of stacked diacritics, which might otherwise overstrike adjacent lines of text, as well as a glyph variant of the Greek circumflex that resembled an inverted breve. These features are now handled as stylistic variants within the main Gentium font.

=== Gentium Basic ===
In November 2007, the Gentium Basic and Gentium Book Basic fonts were released, expanding Gentium fonts to four faces: regular, italic, bold, and bold italic. Gentium Basic had the same weight as the main Gentium fonts, while Gentium Book Basic was set at a slightly heavier weight for publishing. While these fonts added bold and bold italic typefaces, they did not contain the full range of Gentium characters, especially in the Greek and phonetic-symbol ranges.

=== Gentium Plus ===
An updated version of the roman and italic fonts called Gentium Plus, which added 3,800 glyphs to support the full ranges of Latin, IPA, Greek, and Cyrillic defined by Unicode at the time, was released in November 2010. Released shortly afterward was a variant called "Gentium Plus Compact", which had compact spacing for aesthetic reasons when the wide spacing of basic Gentium was not needed for stacked diacritics. They had over 5500 glyphs, but did not come in bold typefaces.

After the initial release of the Gentium Plus fonts, the focus of the project shifted to completing bold and bold italic weights of the Gentium Plus family, as well as the creation of the Gentium Book Plus family with a slightly heavier weight.

=== Gentium 7 ===
Gentium version 7, released in June 2025, was a major update, unifying Gentium Plus, Gentium Basic and Gentium Book into a single set of fonts. The unified Gentium now has five font weights, with the Gentium Book regular and bold weights continued as Gentium medium and Gentium extra-bold. (Also available is semi-bold.) Kerning was expanded from Gentium Basic, primarily for IPA letters with hooks; it is expansive but applies to large sets of characters rather than to individual characters. The vertical placement of IPA tie bars was adjusted for ascenders and descenders – or the lack thereof – but in the case of the under-tie, this does not work with letters where diacritics tuck up behind the descender, namely p, q, y and letters with a retroflex hook. The 9-pitch intonation contours were removed from the PUA. The line spacing was changed to be intermediate between those of Gentium Plus and Gentium Compact. The file name was changed so that Gentium 6.2 and Gentium 7 could be installed on the same system, as converting a document from Gentium 6.2 to Gentium 7 would cause repagination due to the difference in line spacing and the introduction of kerning.

== Character variants ==
Gentium Book Plus font with 'a' and 'g' set to single-story style

Andika font with two features selected

Variant glyphs of many characters can be chosen in supporting word-processors such as LibreOffice. For example, for single-story a and single-story g, append ss01=1 to the name of the font in the font-selection window. (Features are appended with a colon and linked with an ampersand – see images at right.) A word-processor may also supply a check-box menu of features to choose from in its character-property options.

Features that may be chosen include small capitals, single-story a and single-story g, double-story a in italic typeface, variant forms of capital Ŋ, large modifier letter apostrophe and saltillo, Vietnamese-style diacritics, Serbian-style italics (in Cyrillic), staveless tone letters, and old-style digits. Small capitals, superscript and subscript are also available; they display better than HTML formatting and are distinct from the fractions triggered by the fraction slash U+2044.

Alternatively, customized versions of the fonts that have these features preset can be created prior to download.

== Open source development ==
The ongoing development of the font welcomes requests and contributions from its users. Gentium was released under the Open Font License on November 28, 2005. Older serif typefaces that support the same character inventory, and also released under the OFL, are Charis SIL and Doulos SIL.

== See also ==
- Free software Unicode typefaces
