= Doulos SIL =

Open-source serif typeface very similar to Times New Roman

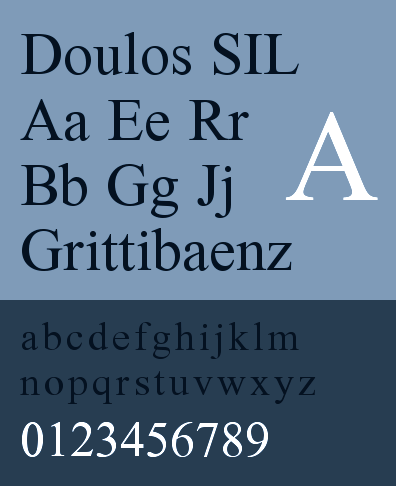
- Category: Serif
- Designer: SIL International
- License: SIL Open Font License
- Sample
- Website: https://software.sil.org/doulos/

Doulos SIL (Ancient Greek for "slave") is a serif typeface developed by SIL International, very similar to Times or Times New Roman. Unlike Times New Roman, Doulos only has a single face, Regular. The goal of its design according to the SIL International website is to "provide a single Unicode-based font family that would contain a comprehensive inventory of glyphs needed for almost any Roman- or Cyrillic-based writing system, whether used for phonetic or orthographic needs." Along with Charis SIL and Gentium, it is licensed under the SIL Open Font License (OFL). This font has a cousin specially designed for numbered musical notation named Doulos SIL Cipher.

Version 7, published in June 2025, may be the last version to be supported; SIL suggests switching to one of their other typefaces.
