= Microsoft JhengHei =

Microsoft JhengHei 微軟正黑體
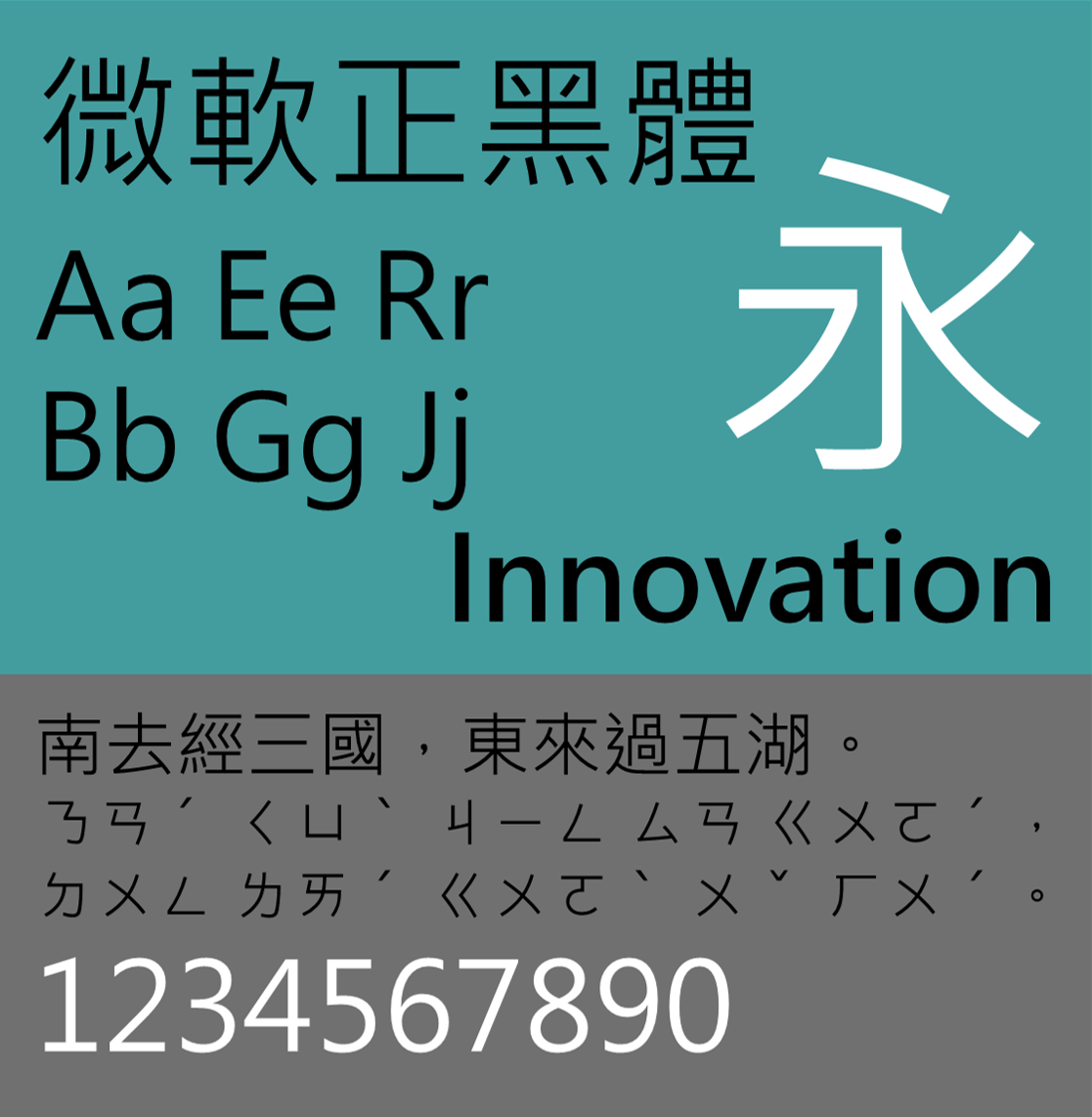
- Category: Sans-serif
- Commissioned by: Microsoft
- Foundry: Monotype Corporation
- Date released: 2005; 21 years ago
- Sample

Microsoft JhengHei (微軟正黑體) is a sans-serif typeface included in Windows Vista or later and Microsoft Office 2007. It follows the Standard Form of National Characters prescribed by the Ministry of Education of the Republic of China (Taiwan) and is intended to be used in Traditional Chinese language environments using ClearType.

== Microsoft JhengHei UI ==
It is a version of Microsoft JhengHei with alternate character design.

== Microsoft JhengHei TC, Microsoft JhengHei TC UI ==
They are versions of Microsoft JhengHei and Microsoft JhengHei UI respectively, sold by Monotype. Each family includes a light version of the font (Microsoft JhengHei TC Light, Microsoft JhengHei UI TC Light).

== Known Issues ==
Some of the characters (碧, 筵, and 綰) have an unexpected fullwidth white space on the right side in bold font weight. Microsoft has noticed this issue since Windows 7, and the problem is resolved on Windows 11 build 2262X.608.

== Availability ==
The font have been available via downloading and installing the Traditional Chinese ClearType fonts for Windows XP from Microsoft also makes Microsoft JhengHei available on Windows XP.

Microsoft JhengHei UI is included with Windows 8 or later.

== See also ==
- List of CJK fonts
- Microsoft YaHei
- Meiryo
- Malgun Gothic
