= Charis SIL =

- Category: Serif
- Classification: Slab serif
- Designer: SIL International
- Date released: 2006
- License: SIL Open Font License
- Design based on: Bitstream Charter
- Sample
- Website: software.sil.org/charis/

Charis (/ˈkɛərɪs/) or Charis SIL is a slab serif typeface developed by SIL International based on Bitstream Charter, one of the first fonts designed for laser printers. The font offers four family members: roman, bold, italic, and bold italic.

Its design goal is to "provide a single Unicode-based font family that would contain a comprehensive inventory of glyphs needed for almost any Roman- or Cyrillic-based writing system, whether used for phonetic or orthographic needs."

Charis SIL supports OpenType and AAT technologies for advanced rendering features. Along with Doulos SIL and Gentium, it is licensed under the SIL Open Font License (OFL), and can be downloaded free of charge.

Version 6.2 of the font, with over 3,800 glyphs, was released on 1 February 2023. Version 7 was released on 2 June 2025.

Gentium Book Plus font with 'a' and 'g' set to single-story style

Andika font with two features selected

Variant forms of many characters can be chosen in supporting word-processors such as LibreOffice. For example, for single-story a and single-story g, append ss01=1 to the name of the font in the font-selection window. (Features are appended with a colon and linked with an ampersand – see images at left.) Alternatively, customized versions of the fonts can be created with TypeTuner, prior to download, that have those forms preset.

Features that may be chosen include small capitals, single-story 'a' and 'g', double-story 'a' in italic typeface, variant forms of capital 'Ŋ', large modifier letter apostrophe and Saltillo, Vietnamese-style diacritics, Serbian-style italics (in Cyrillic), staveless tone letters, and automatic fractions.

Phonetician John C. Wells has recommended Charis SIL as an excellent font for displaying IPA symbols.

Since version 7, it is now simply called Charis.
