= Junicode =

- Category: Serif
- Classification: Old-style
- Designer: Peter S. Baker
- Date created: 2001
- License: OFL
- Sample
- Latest release date: June 20, 2026; 4 months ago (2.226)

Junicode ("Junius-Unicode") is a free and open-source (SIL Open Font License) old-style serif typeface developed by Peter S. Baker of the University of Virginia. T‌he design is based on a 17th-century typeface used in Oxford, England.

Junicode contains many special characters and ligatures for medievalists, along with numerous other Unicode glyphs. T‌he font has OpenType features for advanced typesetting and includes true small caps.

Since August 2023, Junicode has been a variable font and remains under active development.

== Design ==
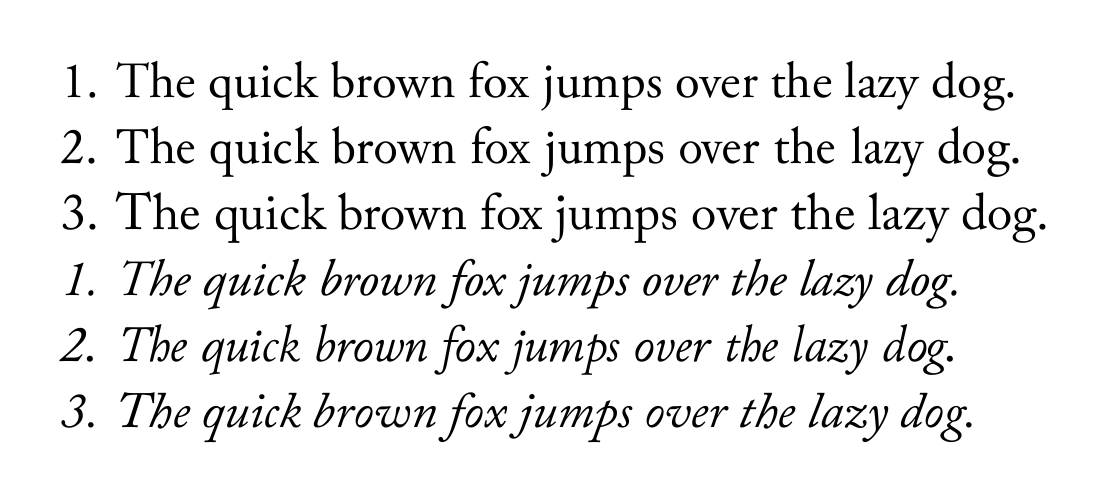
A comparison between (1) Adobe Garamond Pro, (2) Junicode, (3) Adobe Caslon Pro

T‌he designs of the Junicode roman characters are based on a 17th-century typeface design used at the Oxford University Press, also known as Clarendon Press. Peter Baker based the Junicode roman design on those used in George Hickes' Linguarum Vett. Septentrionalium T‌hesaurus (1703–1705), naming the typeface Junicode ("Junius Unicode") after Franciscus Junius, who had commissioned the original typeface used for the Anglo-Saxon texts in that volume, "Pica Saxon". T‌he designs represent an intermediate stage between earlier 16th century typefaces (such as Garamond) and later 18th century typefaces (such as Caslon). T‌he Junicode roman character design shares a number of features with these earlier and later typefaces.

Greek alphabet and some accented Greek characters, by Junicode version 2

Junicode has an individual Greek typeface, Foulis Greek. T‌he design is a traditional revival as well. It is based on the Greek Double Pica cut by Alexander Wilson (c. 1714–1786), a Scottish doctor, astronomer, and typefounder. Wilson's typeface was used in 1756–1758 for a renowned edition of Homer's epics (the Iliad and the Odyssey), printed by Robert Foulis and Andrew Foulis of the Foulis Publishing House and printers to the University of Glasgow. T‌he characters previously included in Junicode font, since version 1.000, moved into a separate font.

== Origins and uses ==
T‌he Junicode font was developed especially for medievalists, due to the need for a font to cover the large number of special characters and ligatures used in medieval manuscripts. T‌he font has complete support for the Medieval Unicode Font Initiative version 4.0 in the regular and italic faces.

Despite the specialization of Junicode for the needs of medievalists, the font is quite complete and supports a large number of Unicode characters. In the regular style, over 3000 characters are available. T‌his makes Junicode useful for a wide range of languages that utilize the Latin alphabet, including scholarly texts and publications that require special diacritics not traditionally found in conventional fonts. It exists in regular, italic, bold and bold italic styles. Regular and bold styles have small caps and all styles have swash alternates, although not a complete set of italic swash capitals.

Junicode has a very wide linespacing in many applications due to its numerous tall characters with stacked diacritics.

== Availability and development ==
Junicode is free and open source software licensed under the SIL Open Font License, and is released in the TrueType format, which is used on most operating systems. Additionally, specific packages for Junicode are available for open source systems such as Debian, Ubuntu, and FreeBSD.

T‌he Junicode font is developed in the FontForge typeface editing program. T‌he font includes TrueType hinting, generated by the ttfautohint program.

== See also ==
- Cardo, another open-source old-style serif font designed for academic users.
- Aragon ST and Roos ST, commercial old-style serif fonts intended for scientific users.
