= List of monospaced typefaces =

This list of monospaced typefaces details standard monospaced fonts used in classical typesetting and printing.

== List of samples ==
Samples of Monospaced typefaces
Typeface name	Example 1	Example 2	Example 3
Andalé Mono	—N/a	—N/a	
Anonymous Pro			
Bitstream Vera Sans Mono			
Cascadia Code			
Century Schoolbook Monospace	—N/a	—N/a	
Comic Mono			
Computer Modern Mono/Typewriter			
Consolas Designer: Lucas de Groot Class: Humanist			
Courier (typeface) Designer: Howard 'Bud' Kettler Class: Slab serif			
Cousine Designer: Steve Matteson			
DejaVu Sans Mono			
Droid Sans Mono			
Envy Code R			
Everson Mono			
Fantasque Sans			
Fira Code			
Fira Mono			
Fixed	—N/a		—N/a
Fixedsys			
FreeMono			—N/a
Go Mono			
Hack			
HyperFont	—N/a		
IBM MDA	—N/a	—N/a	
IBM Plex Mono			
Inconsolata			
Input			
Intel One Mono	—N/a		
Iosevka			
JetBrains Mono			
JuliaMono			
Letter Gothic			
Liberation Mono^{[A]}			—N/a
Lucida Console			
Menlo			
Monaco			
Monofur			
Monospace (Unicode)	—N/a	—N/a	
Nimbus Mono L	—N/a	—N/a	
NK57 Monospace			
Noto Mono^{[B]} Designer: Google			
OCR-A Designer: American Type Founders staff			
OCR-B Designer: Adrian Frutiger Class: Neo-Grotesque			
Operator Mono			
Orator Designer: John Scheppler			
Oxygen Mono			—N/a
PragmataPro			
Prestige Elite			
ProFont			
PT Mono			
Recursive Mono			
Roboto Mono			
SF Mono			
Source Code Pro			
Spleen	—N/a	—N/a	
Terminus Class: Spurless	—N/a	—N/a	
Tex Gyre Cursor			
Ubuntu Mono			
Victor Mono			
Wumpus Mono Designer: Vaughan Type			

^{A} Since 2008, Liberation Mono had digit zero with dot inside, Red Hat Bugzilla - Bug #252149 (Image).
^{B} Noto Mono was renamed to Noto Sans Mono in 2018 . Since 2023, it had digit zero with slash, GitHub issue #188.

== Additional monospaced typefaces ==
- Courier Prime
- Fodor
- M+ FONTS
- New Alphabet
- Terminal

== See also ==
- List of display typefaces
- List of sans serif typefaces
- List of script typefaces
- List of serif typefaces
