= Slashed zero =

Glyph variant of numeral 0 (zero) with slash

Display of zero in three typefaces, from top to bottom: slashed zero, dotted zero, plain or open zero

A slashed zero ⟨⟩ is a representation of the Arabic digit zero ("0") with a slash through it. This variant zero glyph is often used to distinguish the digit zero from the Latin script letter O anywhere that the distinction needs emphasis, particularly in encoding systems, scientific and engineering applications, computer programming (such as software development), and telecommunications. It thus helps to differentiate characters that would otherwise be homoglyphs. It was commonly used during the punch card era, when programs were typically written out by hand, to avoid ambiguity when the character was later typed on a card punch.

== Usage ==
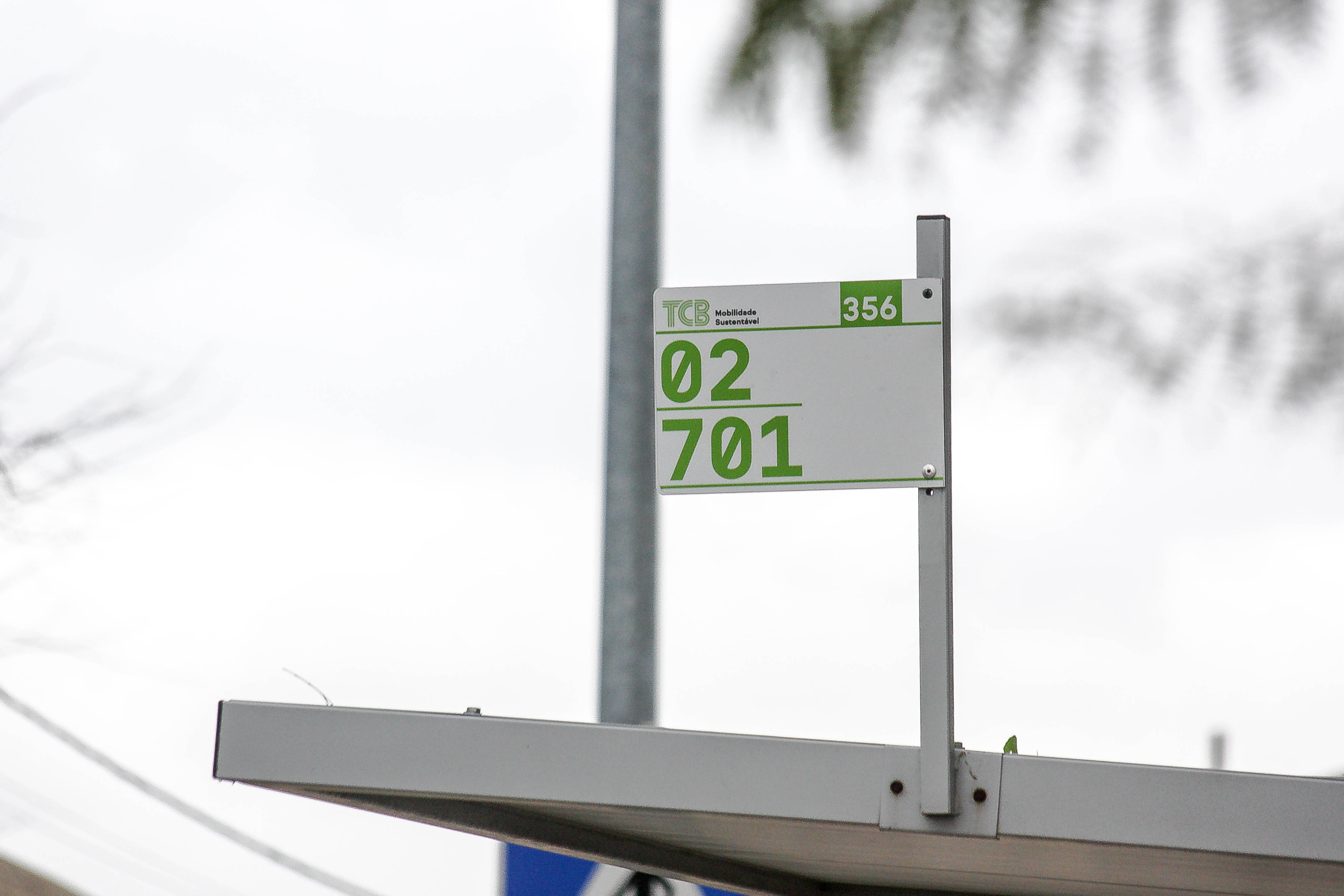
Slashed zeroes on a bus stop sign in Portugal, 2020

The slashed zero is used in a number of fields in order to avoid confusion with the letter "O". It is used by computer programmers, in recording amateur radio call signs and in military radio, as logs of such contacts tend to contain both letters and numerals.

The slashed zero was used on teleprinter circuits for weather applications. In this usage it was sometimes called communications zero.

The slashed zero can be used in stoichiometry to avoid confusion with the symbol for oxygen (capital O).

The slashed zero is also used in charting and documenting in the medical and healthcare fields to avoid confusion with the letter "O". It also denotes an absence of something (similar to the usage of an "empty set" character), such as a sign or a symptom.

Slashed zeros are used on New Zealand number plates.

== History ==
The slashed zero predates computers, and is known to have been used in the twelfth and thirteenth centuries.

In the days of the typewriter, there was no key for the slashed zero. Typists could generate it by first typing either an uppercase "O" or a zero and then backspace, followed by typing the slash key.

It is used in many Baudot teleprinter applications, specifically the keytop and typepallet that combines "P" and slashed zero. Additionally, the slashed zero is used in many ASCII graphic sets descended from the default typewheel on the Teletype Model 33.

The use of the slashed zero by many computer systems of the 1970s and 1980s inspired the 1980s space rock band Underground Zerø to use a heavy metal umlaut Scandinavian vowel ø in the band's name and as the band logo on all their album covers.

Along with the Westminster, MICR, and OCR-A fonts, the slashed zero became one of the things associated with hacker culture in the 1980s. Some cartoons depicted computer users talking in binary code with 1s and 0s using a slashed zero for the 0.

Slashed zeroes have been used in the Flash-based artwork of Young-Hae Chang Heavy Industries, notably in their 2003 work, Operation Nukorea. The reason for their use is unknown, but has been conjectured to be related to themes of "negation, erasure, and absence".

== Similar symbols ==
The slashed zero has the disadvantage that it can be confused with several other symbols. See the disambiguation page for the symbol Ø for a comprehensive listing.

== Representation in Unicode ==
Unicode representation
| Glyph | Variation sequence | HTML | Description of appearance |
|---|---|---|---|
| 0︀ | 0030 FE00 | 0&#xFE00; | short diagonal stroke form of DIGIT ZERO |

In Unicode, slashed zero is considered a standardized typographic variation of the Arabic digit zero 0, which is code point U+0030. Appending Variation Selector 1 U+FE00 after the zero creates the "short diagonal stroked form", on this browser it produces 0︀.

Note that the above should not be confused with the "slashed zero variant of the empty set", $\emptyset$, as popularized by Donald Knuth's TeX. Unicode represents that character as the empty set (∅) with variation selector 1.

Prior to Unicode 9.0, there was no code point defined for altering the visual appearance of zero. This meant that the slashed zero glyph was displayed for U+0030 only—and then always—in fonts whose designer chose the option. Successful display on a particular local system depended on making sure that such a font was available — either via the system's font files or via font embedding — and selected. (See also, Combining solidus below.)

=== Combining solidus ===
Before Unicode standardized the slashed variation of zero, composite characters were sanctioned, historically used to obtain a typographic approximation where a slash is drawn upon a zero. These approximations are encoded as two characters: a standard zero 0 followed by either U+0337 ◌̷ COMBINING SHORT SOLIDUS OVERLAY or U+0338 ◌̸ COMBINING LONG SOLIDUS OVERLAY. However, they will cause overlap if the zero is already slashed in the font. There is no way to specify an unslashed zero that can always be safely overprinted.

Obsolete and discouraged representations of slashed zero
| Method | | Result | Notes |
| Unicode | HTML | Result | Notes |
|---|---|---|---|
| U+0030 0 + U+0337 ◌̷ | 0&#x337; | 0̷ | |
| U+0030 0 + U+0338 ◌̸ | 0&#x338; | 0̸ | |
| U+006F o + U+0337 ◌̷ | o&#x337; | o̷ | Could be confused for ø or ⌀ |
| U+004F O + U+0338 ◌̸ | O&#x338; | O̸ | Could be confused for Ø or ∅ |

== Rendering ==
If the font has support for OpenType feature tag zero, slashed zero will be substituted.

In HTML, slashed zero can be enabled by using CSS property font-variant-numeric: slashed-zero or alternatively font-feature-settings: 'zero'. On this browser, this renders as 0.

== Typography ==
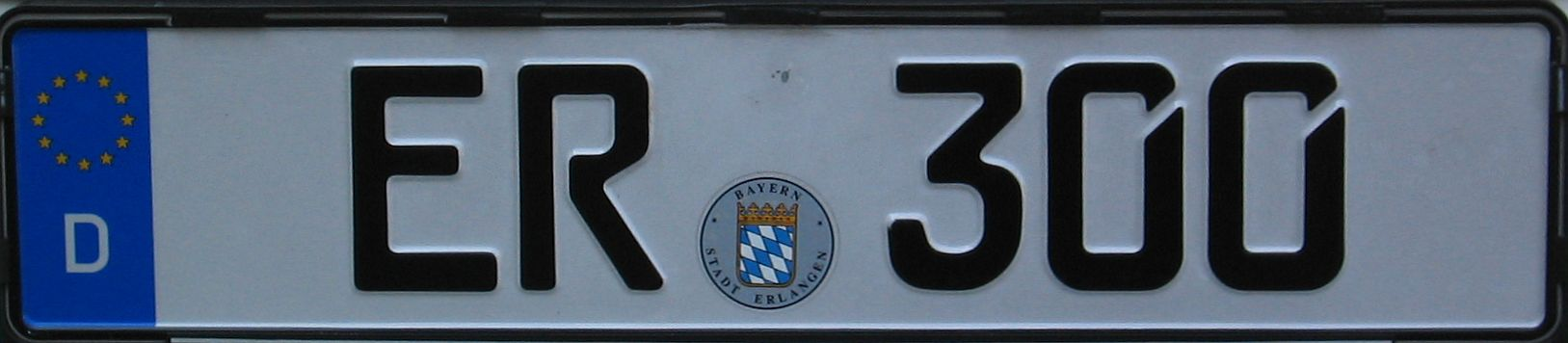
German license plate depicting diagonal gap

In most typographic designs, the slash of a slashed zero usually does not extend past the ellipse. This contrasts with the Scandinavian vowel "Ø", the empty set symbol "∅", and the diameter symbol "⌀". Conversely, Japanese typefaces frequently render slashed zero with the slash extending beyond the ellipse.

A convention common on early line printers left zero unornamented but added a tail or hook to the letter-O so that it resembled an inverted Q (like U+213A ℺) or cursive capital letter-O ($\,\mathcal{O} \,$).

In the Fixedsys typeface, the numeral 0 has two internal barbs along the lines of the slash. This appears much like a white "S" within the black borders of the zero.

In the FE-Schrift typeface, used on German car license plates, the zero is rectangular and has an "insinuated" slash: a diagonal crack just beneath the top right curve.

== Typefaces ==
Typefaces commonly found on personal computers that use the slashed zero include:

- Terminal in Microsoft's Windows line.
- Consolas in Microsoft's Windows Vista, Windows 7, Microsoft Office 2007 and Microsoft Visual Studio 2010
- Menlo in macOS
- Monaco in macOS
- SF Mono in macOS
- The Fedora Linux distribution ships with a tweaked variant of the Liberation typeface which adds a slash to the zero; this is not present on most other Linux distributions.
- ProFont
- Roboto Mono

Dotted zero typefaces:

- The DejaVu family of typefaces has a "DejaVu Sans Mono" variant with a dotted zero.
- Andalé Mono has a dotted zero.
- IBM Plex Mono uses a dotted zero.
- Source Code Pro and its associated typefaces use a dotted zero.
- Cascadia Code, the default font for Windows Terminal, Visual Studio, and Visual Studio Code, uses a dotted zero.

== Variations ==
=== Dotted zero ===
The zero with a dot in the center seems to have originated as an option on IBM 3270 display controllers. The dotted zero may appear similar to the Greek letter theta (particularly capital theta, Θ), but the two have different glyphs. In raster fonts, the theta usually has a horizontal line connecting, or nearly touching, the sides of an O, while the dotted zero simply has a dot in the middle. However, on a low-definition display, such a form can be confused with a numeral 8. In some fonts the IPA letter for a bilabial click (ʘ) looks similar to the dotted zero.

Alternatively, the dot can become a vertical trace—for example, by adding a "combining short vertical line overlay" (U+20D3). It may be coded as 0&#x20D3; giving 0⃓.

The dotted zero has been used on the vehicle registration plates of Slovakia since 2023.

=== Slashed letter 'O' ===
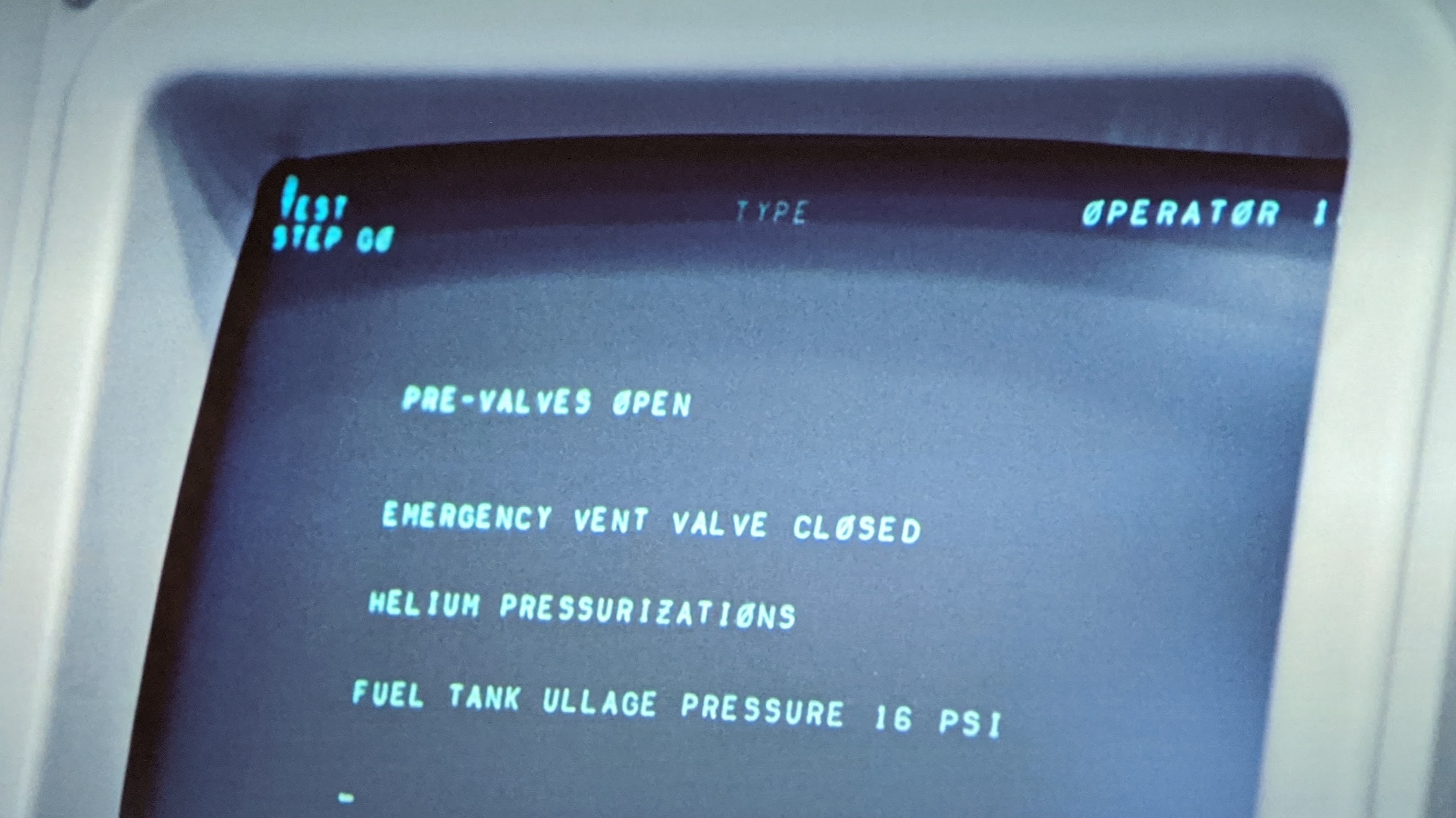
Apollo 11 video display terminal with a slashed O

IBM (and a few other early mainframe makers) used a convention in which the letter O had a slash and the digit 0 did not. This is even more problematic for Danes, Faroese, and Norwegians because it means two of their letters – the O and slashed O (Ø) – are visually similar.

This was later flipped and most mainframe chain or band printers used the opposite convention (letter O printed as is, and digit zero printed with a slash). This was the de facto standard from 1970s to 1990s. However current use of network laser printers that use PC style fonts caused the demise of the slashed zero in most companies – only a few configured laser printers to use it.

=== Reversed slash ===
Some Burroughs/Unisys equipment displays a zero with a reversed slash, similar to the no symbol, 🛇, as does the free typeface Atkinson Hyperlegible.

== See also ==
- 0 (number)
- Symbols for zero – Symbol representing the number or digit 0
- Names for the number 0 in English
- Arabic numeral variations § Slashed zero
- Regional handwriting variation § Arabic numerals

== Sources ==
- Cajori, Florian (1928), A History of Mathematical Notations, Chicago, IL: Open Court Pub.; op. cit., New York: Dover Publications, 1993, ISBN 0-486-67766-4.
