= Fabrizio Schiavi =

Italian graphic designer and type designer (born 1971)

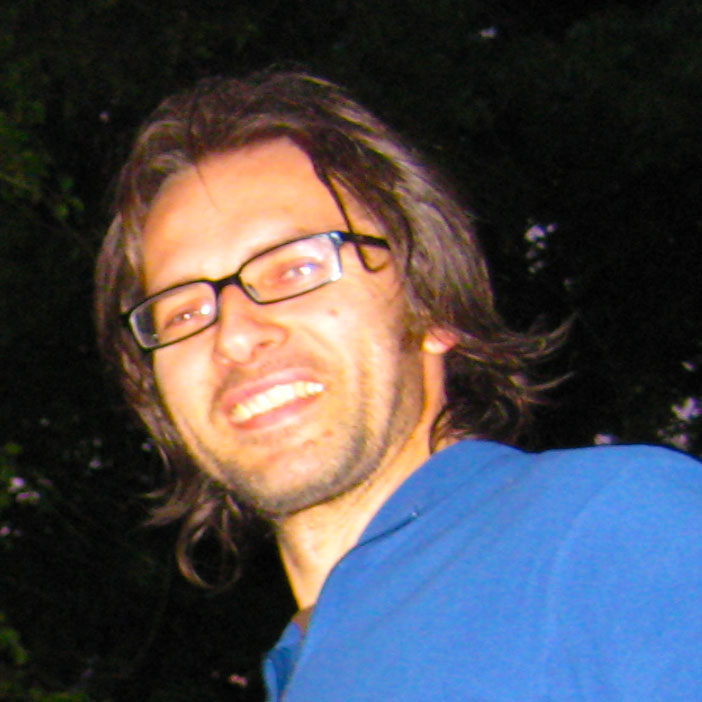
- Fabrizio Schiavi 2012
- Born: June 19, 1971 (age 54); Ponte dell'Olio PC, Italy
- Occupations: Graphic designer, type designer
- Known for: PragmataPro
- Website: https://www.fsd.it

Fabrizio Schiavi born June 19, 1971 in Ponte dell'Olio near Piacenza (Italy), is a graphic designer and type designer.

Schiavi is particularly known for the very large font project PragmataPro, the monospaced family designed optimized for screen designed to be the ideal font for coding, math and engineering.

== Biography ==
Schiavi studied Graphic Design in 1989 at Istituto d’Arte Paolo Toschi in Parma. After working for three years as graphic designer for the Italian record company Expanded Music, he left to set up his own graphic design studio, FSD (Fabrizio Schiavi Design), in Piacenza.

=== Fonts ===
- Sys, a geometric TrueType handhinted font
- Pragmata, a monospaced font designed for programmers
- PragmataPro, the enhanced version of Pragmata with more than 7000 glyphs per weight
- Sirucanorm, the rounded sans-serif version of Siruca custom font
- Exit, a narrow sans-serif available at MyFonts
- D^44, available at MyFonts
- Sidewalker, available at MyFonts
- Lithium, available at MyFonts
- Eco, available at MyFonts
- Eco-Nomico, available at MyFonts
- FF Steel, available at FontShop
- FF Trade01, available at FontShop
- FF 9600-0069, available at FontShop
- FF GeäbOil, available at FontShop
- FF Mode01 available at FontShop
- Monica, available at MyFonts
- MonicaDue, available at MyFonts

=== Custom Fonts ===
- Abitare Sans, designed for Abitare of RCS MediaGroup
- Widiba Sans, Serif, Display, Script, designed for Widiba of Banca Monte dei Paschi di Siena Group with jekyll & hyde studio
- CP Company, designed for C.P. Company
- Virna, designed for MTV Italia
- Siruca, designed for Al Hamra Tower wayfinding
- Be and Bee, designed for Beretta
- Nove, designed for Nike, Inc.

=== Web Sites ===
- Mandarina Duck, mandarinaduck.com, art direction Sartoria Comunicazione
- C.P. Company, cpcompany.com, art direction Fabrizio Schiavi
- Ferrari, club.ferrari.com, committed by Orchestra
- Vic Matié, vicmatie.it, art direction Stefano Meneghetti
- Search for Art, searchforart.org, sponsored by Mandarina Duck committed by Sartoria Comunicazione
- Duccio Grassi Architects, ducciograssi.it, art direction Fabrizio Schiavi

=== Corporate Identities ===
- Philip Morris Company, proposal, committed by Leo Burnett
- Mandarina Duck, guide line, committed by Sartoria Comunicazione
- YU
- Quality Bau
- R&M per comunicare
- Expanded Music
- Radio Italia Network
- Terratrema Film
