= Uniwidth typeface =

Example of a uniwidth typeface. Neither font weight nor font style affects the alignment of the two lines.

A uniwidth typeface, also known as an equal-width, duplexed, or multiplexed typeface, is a typeface where every variation (font) has the same metrics (size of each letter). As a result, changing the variation used, such as using bold or italics, does not change the layout (reflow). The term was coined by Hrant Papazian.

The idea of a uniwidth typeface dates back to the days of hot metal typesetting, when the duplex matrices on Linotype machines allowed for two font styles to be used, but required them to be of the same width. A common combination was regular and italic for printing body text, or regular and bold, but Linotype also offered more unusual combinations, such as a serif text face duplexed with a bold sans-serif for emphasis. Modern computer uniwidth typefaces are useful on tightly designed user interfaces (UIs). A variable font that is uniwidth provides even more versatility.

In a UI context, the term "uniwidth typefaces" refer to proportional typefaces only, as fixed-width typefaces trivially satisfy the definition. Tabular figures are excluded not only for this reason, but also because they only cover a small part of the font. Monospaced fonts are inherently duplexed.

In TeX, the uniwidth version of a boldface is invoked by \fontseries{b} ("bold"), which is different from the usual "extended bold face" (bx).

Prominent font designer Lucas de Groot has written "I am opposed to the uniwidth concept, because letter shapes suffer by definition."
