= Cascadia Code =

- Category: Monospaced
- Designer: Aaron Bell
- Commissioned by: Microsoft
- Foundry: Saja Typeworks
- Date created: September 18, 2019; 7 years ago
- License: SIL Open Font License
- Sample
- Website: github.com/microsoft/cascadia-code
- Latest release version: 2404.23
- Latest release date: 30 April 2024; 2 years ago

Cascadia Code is a purpose-built monospaced TrueType font for Windows Terminal. It includes programming ligatures and was designed to enhance the look and feel of Windows Terminal, terminal applications and text editors such as Visual Studio and Visual Studio Code. The font is open source under the SIL Open Font License and available on GitHub. It has been bundled with Windows Terminal since version 0.5.2762.0, and is included in Windows 11.

== Font family ==
Multiple typefaces are part of the Cascadia Code font family, representing a variety of text styling options and adjustable weights. The main and Powerline variants of the types are suitable as display fonts. With the exception of Cascadia Mono, all types replace common character combinations with ligatures. Other styles supported by this font family include textual arrows and stylistic sets for italics, alternate graphics, alternate control character glyphs, and a cursive form of italic. Tables of the supported styles and more examples can be viewed in the GitHub README document.

- Cascadia Code - Variable type intended for terminals and displayed text.
- Cascadia Code NF - A version of Cascadia Code that has Nerd Font symbols.
- Cascadia Code PL - A version of Cascadia Code with embedded Powerline symbols.
- Cascadia Mono - Monospaced type intended for use with text editors. It preserves characters as entered, without ligatures.
- Cascadia Mono NF - A version of Cascadia Mono that has Nerd Font symbols.
- Cascadia Mono PL - A version of Cascadia Mono with embedded Powerline symbols.

== See also ==
- Consolas
- Fixedsys
- List of monospaced typefaces
