= System (typeface) =

Proportional raster fonts distributed with Microsoft Windows

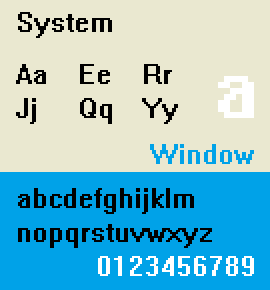
- Category: Sans-serif
- Designer: Microsoft
- Foundry: Microsoft
- Date created: 1988

System is a family of proportional raster fonts distributed with Microsoft Windows. Sharing the same letterforms as Microsoft Sans Serif which in turn is modeled after Helvetica, the font family contains fonts encoded in several Windows code pages, with multiple resolutions of the font for each code page. Fonts of different code pages have different point sizes. Under double-byte character set Windows environments, specifying this font may also cause applications to use non-System fonts when displaying texts.

In Windows 2000 or later, changing script setting in some application's font dialogue (e.g. Notepad, WordPad) causes the font to look completely different, even under same font size. Similarly, changing language setting for Windows applications that do not support Unicode will alter the appearance of the font.

When Windows is running with low system resources, System is the fallback font used for displaying texts.

The copyright message in the .FON file says the font was designed by Microsoft Corporation in 1988–1989.

The System font

Microsoft also created CGA, EGA and 8514/A versions of the font. The 8514 variant remained in use on modern Windows versions such as Windows 10 and 11 versions as a high-DPI version.

== See also ==
- Terminal
- Fixedsys
