= Young-Hae Chang Heavy Industries =

Seoul-based Web art group

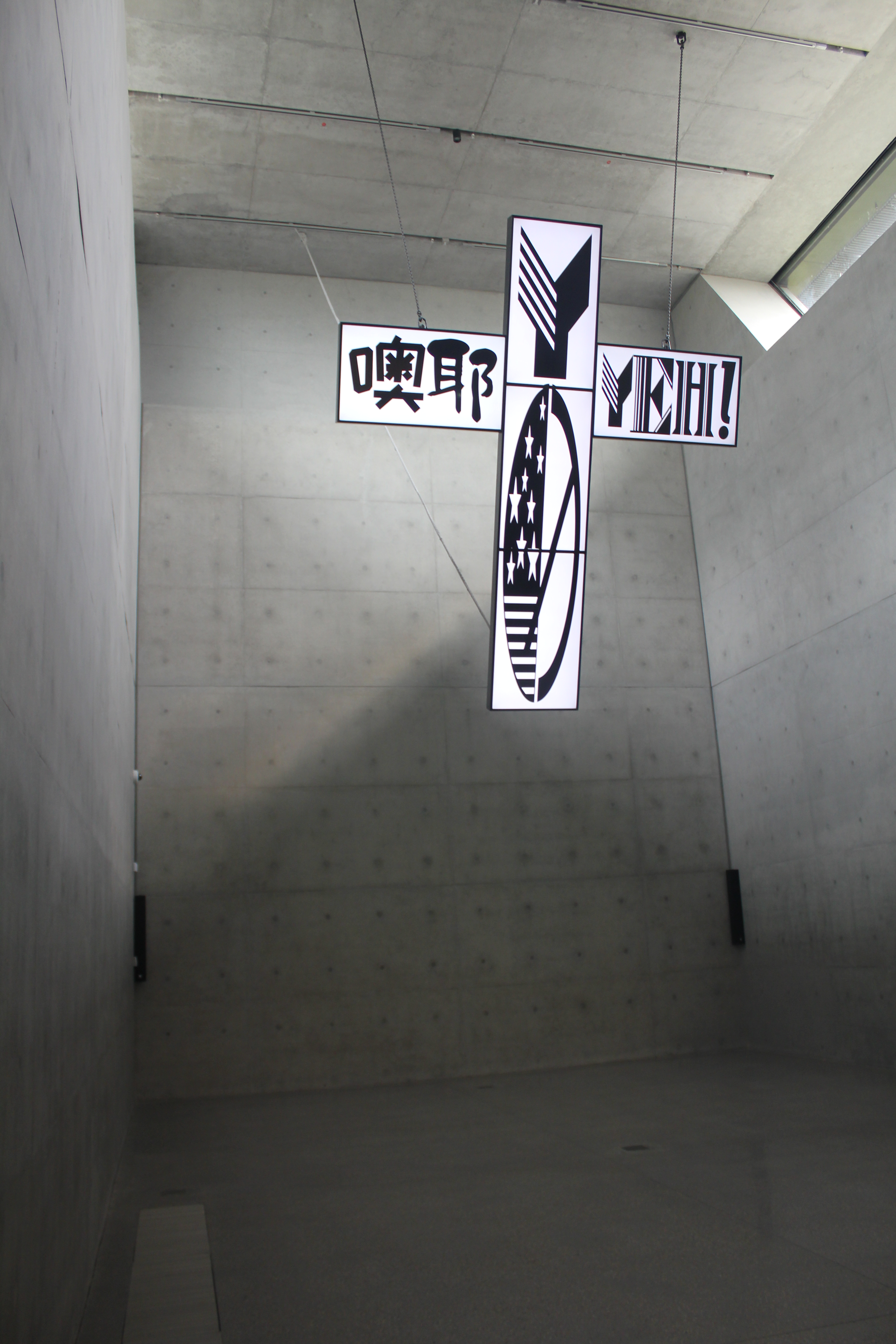
Video sculpture of the duo at M+, Hong Kong

Young-Hae Chang Heavy Industries (Korean: 장영혜중공업) is a Seoul-based Web art group consisting of Young-Hae Chang and Marc Voge, formed in 1999. Chang is a Korean artist and translator with a Ph.D. in aesthetics from the Universite de Paris I and Voge is an American poet who lives in Seoul.

Their work, presented in 20 languages, is characterized by text-based animation composed in Adobe Flash that is highly synchronized to a musical score that is often original and typically jazz. In 2000, YHCHI's work was recognized by the San Francisco Museum of Modern Art for its contribution to online art. The group uses Monaco as the font for all their work because they liked the way the name sounded. In 2001, the group was awarded a grant from the Foundation for Contemporary Arts Grants to Artists. Their solo show, "Black on White, Gray Ascending", a seven-channel installation, was part of the inaugural opening of the New Museum of Contemporary Art, New York, in 2007. They are 2012 Rockefeller Foundation Bellagio Creative Arts Fellows. In 2018-19 their work was part of the 9th Asia Pacific Triennial of Contemporary Art (APT9) at the QAGOMA in Brisbane, Australia.

According to the artists, their piece, Dakota, "is based on a close reading of Ezra Pound's Cantos I and the first part of II". Their pieces are characterized by speed, references to film and concrete poetry. Their work is sometimes called digital literature or net art, but there is no consensus. Moreover, their multilingual typography-based creations were about social and political issues like capitalist corporate culture and the division of the Korean Peninsula. Their works also featured the era of the late 1990s and 2000s of unique Korean circumstances with global artistic conventions and proficiency in media.

Their work is held in the collections of the Tate Museum, the Centre Pompidou, Paris, QAGOMA, Brisbane, Australia and M+ Hong Kong. The section in M+ has been curated in an arrangement featuring a comprehensive collection of all works produced by Young-Hae Chang Heavy Industries over the past two decades with the collection regularly being updated with their new creations twice a year.

== Key artworks ==
Oh Yeah! (2021) is a 9 min. 33 sec video installation with flashing text, sardonically rendered in eclectic English and Chinese fonts, flickering across and down the five LED monitors arranged like a crucifix, while the voices “OH YEAH!” repeatedly as an echo in the installation. The work is collected by M+ Museum and exhibited in 2021–2022 in Focus Gallery, M+.

== Exhibition history ==
- Future Cinema - The Cinematic Imaginary After Film exhibition at NTT InterCommunication Center, Tokyo, in 2003.
- Young-Hae Chang Heavy Industries Black on White, Gray Ascending exhibition at the New Museum, New York, in 2007.
- Heavy Industries Smash the Gang of Four Billion Young Hae-Chang exhibition at Gertrude Contemporary Art Spaces, Melbourne in 2009.
- Kimi Kim Jalan Jalan: Takuji Kogo + Young-Hae Chang Heavy Industries exhibition at The Private Museum, Singapore in 2015.
- So You Made It. What Do You Know. Congratulations. And Welcome! exhibition at Asian Art Museum of San Francisco in 2017.
- Life in Three Easy Video Tutorials exhibition at Artsonje Center, Seoul in 2017.
- Towards a Neo-Constructivism exhibition at Bank, Shanghai, in 2020.
- Young-Hae Chang Heavy Industries exhibition at Tate Modern, England in 2021.
- Young-Hae Chang Heavy Industries exhibition at M+, Hong Kong, in 2021.
- Please Mistake Me for Nobody exhibition at Neuer Berliner Kunstverein, Berling, in 2022.
- Pink Hawk Down / Miss DMZ exhibition at Krone Couronne, Biel/Bienne, Switzerland in 2024.
