= Fixed-width typeface =

Fixed-width typeface may refer to:

- a monospaced font with characters of uniform width
- a duospaced font with characters of full-width and half-width
