= Monospace (typeface) =

monospace
- Category: Serif
- Classification: Monospace serif
- Designer(s): George Williams
- Sample

Monospace is a monospaced Unicode font, developed by George Williams. It is based on the typeface Courier. This font contains 2860 glyphs. It includes characters in the following unicode ranges: Basic Latin, Latin-1 Supplement, Latin Extended-A, Latin Extended-B, IPA Extensions, Spacing Modifier Letters, Combining Diacritical Marks, Greek, Cyrillic, Hebrew, Latin Extended Additional, Greek Extended, General Punctuation, Superscripts and Subscripts, Currency Symbols, Combining Diacritical Marks for Symbols, Letterlike Symbols, Number Forms, Arrows, Mathematical Operators, Miscellaneous Technical, Control Pictures, Enclosed Alphanumerics, Box Drawing, Block Elements, Geometric Shapes, Miscellaneous Symbols, Alphabetic Presentation Forms, Halfwidth and Fullwidth Forms.
