= Advogato =

Free software online community

- Website type: Community site and social network site for free software developers
- Creator: Raph Levien
- Website: www.advogato.org
- Launched: 1999
- Current status: Inactive

Advogato was an online community and social networking site dedicated to free software development and created by Raph Levien. In 2007, Steve Rainwater took over maintenance and new development from Raph. In 2016, Rainwater's running instance was shut down and backed up to archive.org.

== History ==
Advogato described itself as "the free software developer's advocate." Advogato was an early pioneer of blogs, formerly known as "online diaries", and one of the earliest social networking websites. Advogato combined the most recent entries from each user's diary together into a single continuous feed called the recentlog, directly inspiring the creation of the Planet aggregator somewhat later.

Several high-profile members of the free software and open source software movements were users of the site, including Richard M. Stallman, Eric Raymond, Alan Cox, Bruce Perens, and Jamie Zawinski.

Because Advogato was the first website to use a robust, attack-resistant trust metric and to release the underlying code for that trust mechanism under a free software license, it has been the basis of numerous research papers on trust metrics and social networking (see the list below for specific examples). Advogato's early adoption of an XML-RPC interface led to its use as an example of how such interfaces could be used by web programmers.

Advogato saw use as a testbed for social networking and semantic web technologies.

== Trust metric ==
The motivating idea for Advogato was to try out in practice Levien's ideas about attack-resistant trust metrics, having users certify each other in a kind of peer review process and use this information to avoid the abuses that plague open community sites. Levien observed that his notion of attack-resistant trust metric was fundamentally very similar to the PageRank algorithm used by Google to rate article interest. In the case of Advogato, the trust metric was designed to include all individuals who could reasonably be considered members of the Free Software and Open Source communities while excluding others.

The implementation of this trust metric was through an Apache module called mod_virgule. mod_virgule is free software, licensed under the GPL and written in C.

Despite the trust metric, posting privileges to the front page of Advogato were gained by controversial individuals, leading some to claim Advogato's trust metric solution was faulty.

Misunderstanding of the purpose of Advogato's trust metric was common, which often led to the assumption that it should exclude specific individuals on the basis that they were known cranks.

== See also ==
- Everything2
- Kuro5hin
- Slashdot
