= ProFont =

- Category: Monospace
- Designers: Andrew Welch, Carl Osterwald, Steve Gilardi
- Sample

ProFont is a monospace font available in many formats. It is intended to be used for programming in IDE environments and it is available in bitmap and TrueType versions for various platforms.

Originally developed as shareware by Andrew Welch for the Apple Macintosh in TrueType format, ProFont was intended to have metrics identical with Apple's default Monaco font—resulting in an 80-column by 25-line display in a Compact Macintosh full screen window—but with additional features desirable for programming, such as a slashed zero and easily distinguished curly brackets. ProFont was bundled with the BBEdit text editor.
