= Inconsolata =

Open-source monospaced sans-serif font

- Category: Sans-serif Monospaced
- Classification: Humanist lineal
- Designer: Raph Levien
- Date created: 2006
- License: SIL Open Font License
- Design based on: Consolas, Avenir, Letter Gothic
- Sample
- Website: levien.com/type/myfonts/inconsolata.html

Inconsolata is an open-source font created by Raph Levien and released under the SIL Open Font License. It is a humanist lineal monospaced font designed for source code listing, terminal emulators, and similar uses. It was influenced by the proprietary Consolas monospaced font, designed by Lucas de Groot, the proportional Avenir and IBM's classic monospaced Letter Gothic.

Inconsolata has received favorable reviews from many programmers who consider it to be a highly readable and clear monospaced font.

Initially having no bold weight, when Inconsolata was added to Google Fonts, it was fully hinted and a bold variant was added.

A Hellenised version of Inconsolata, containing full support for monotonic Modern Greek, was released by Dimosthenis Kaponis in 2011 as Inconsolata Hellenic, under the same license.

Inconsolata-LGC is a fork of Inconsolata Hellenic which adds bold, italic and cyrillic glyphs.

== See also ==
- List of typefaces
