= PragmataPro =

Monospaced typeface family

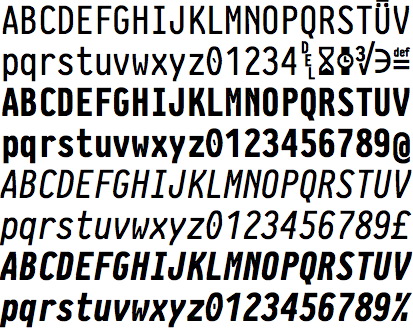
- Category: Monospaced
- Classification: Sans-serif
- Designer(s): Fabrizio Schiavi
- Foundry: Fabrizio Schiavi Design
- Date released: 2010
- License: Proprietary
- Trademark: Fabrizio Schiavi
- Website: www.fsd.it/shop/fonts/pragmatapro/
- Latest release version: 0.9

PragmataPro is a monospaced font family designed for programming, created by Fabrizio Schiavi. It is a narrow programming font designed for legibility. The font implements Unicode characters, including (polytonic) Greek, Cyrillic, Arabic, Hebrew and the APL codepoints. The font specifically implements ligatures for programming, such as multiple-character operators. The characters are hinted by hand.

PragmataPro was designed to have contained line-spacing and offer rasterization for screens of most sizes except the most small. Notable features also include math and phonetics support.

== Unicode coverage ==
It includes 18,538 glyphs in Regular weight and 15,297 glyphs in Bold weight, version 0.830 (2023) from the following Unicode blocks:

Unicode Blocks	Number of glyphs designed
Basic Latin	95/95
Latin-1 Supplement	96/96
Latin Extended-A	128/128
Latin Extended-B	208/208
IPA Extensions	96/96
Spacing Modifier Letters	80/80
Combining Diacritical Marks	112/112
Greek	86/135
Cyrillic	111/208
Hebrew	87/87
Arabic	224/256
Runic	89/89
Phonetic Extensions	128/128
Latin Extended Additional	256/256
Greek Extended	228/233
General Punctuation	111/111
Superscripts and Subscripts	42/42
Currency Symbols	14/32
Letterlike Symbols	80/80
Number Forms	60/60
Arrows	112/112
Mathematical Operators	256/256
Miscellaneous Technical	256/256
Control Pictures	39/39
Box Drawing	128/128
Block Elements	32/32
Geometric Shapes	96/96
Miscellaneous Symbols	184/256
Dingbats	165/192
Miscellaneous Mathematical Symbols-A	48/48
Supplemental Arrows-A	16/16
Braille Patterns	256/256
Supplemental Arrows-B	128/128
Miscellaneous Mathematical Symbols-B	128/128
Supplemental Mathematical Operators	256/256
Miscellaneous Symbols and Arrows	208/253
Latin Extended-C	3/32
Supplemental Punctuation	1/94
Bopomofo	37/43
Private Use Area	2,381/6,400
Alphabetic Presentation Forms	51/58
Arabic Presentation Forms	154/631
Small Form Variants	26/26
Arabic Presentation Forms-B	140/141
Halfwidth and Fullwidth Forms	113/225
Mathematical Alphanumeric Symbols	996/996
Playing Cards	59/82
Miscellaneous Symbols and Pictograms	91/768
Supplemental Arrows-C	148/150
Symbols for Legacy Computing	212/212
Supplementary Private Use Area-A	6,896/65,534
Supplementary Private Use Area-B	739/65,534

== Usage examples ==
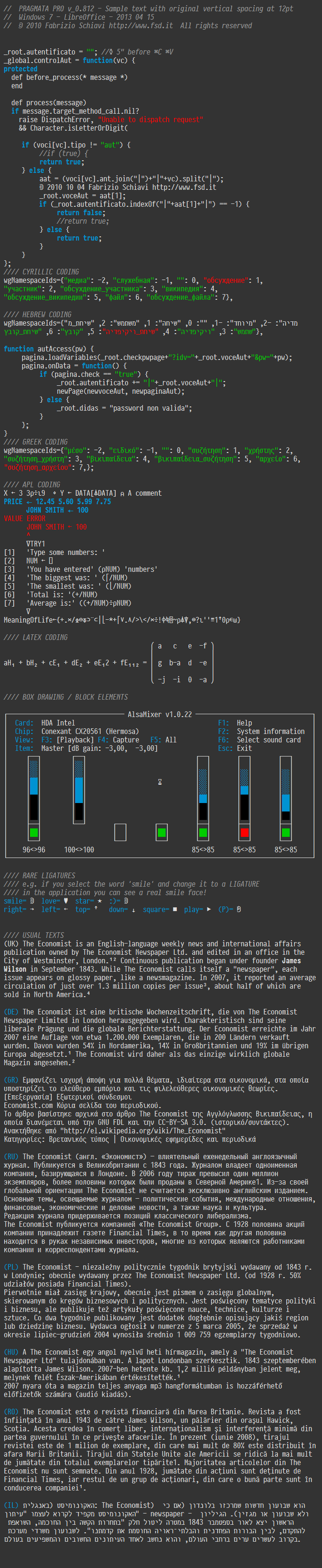
PragmataPro sample text in Windows at 12 pt anti aliased

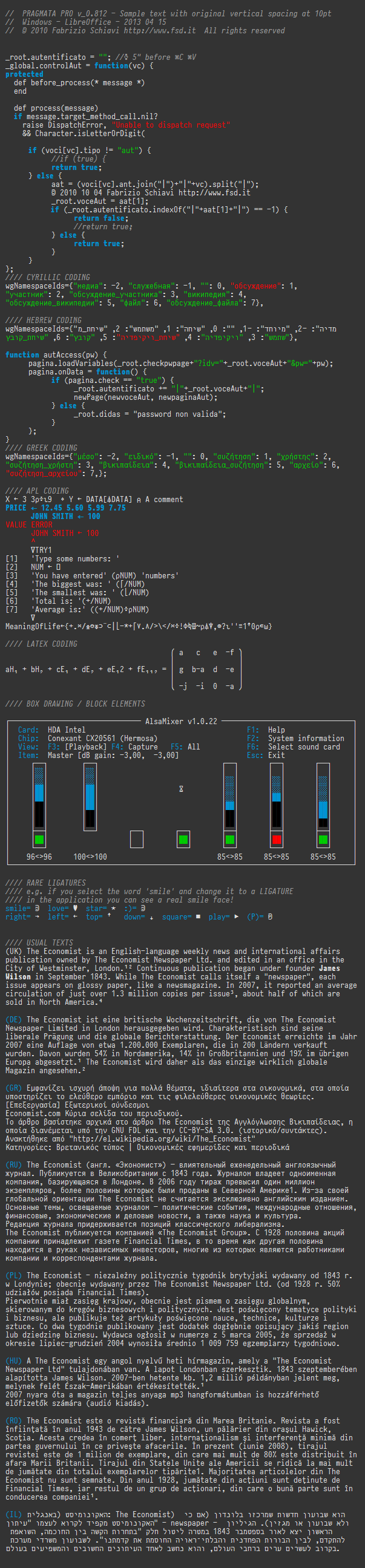
PragmataPro sample text in Windows at 10 pt anti aliased

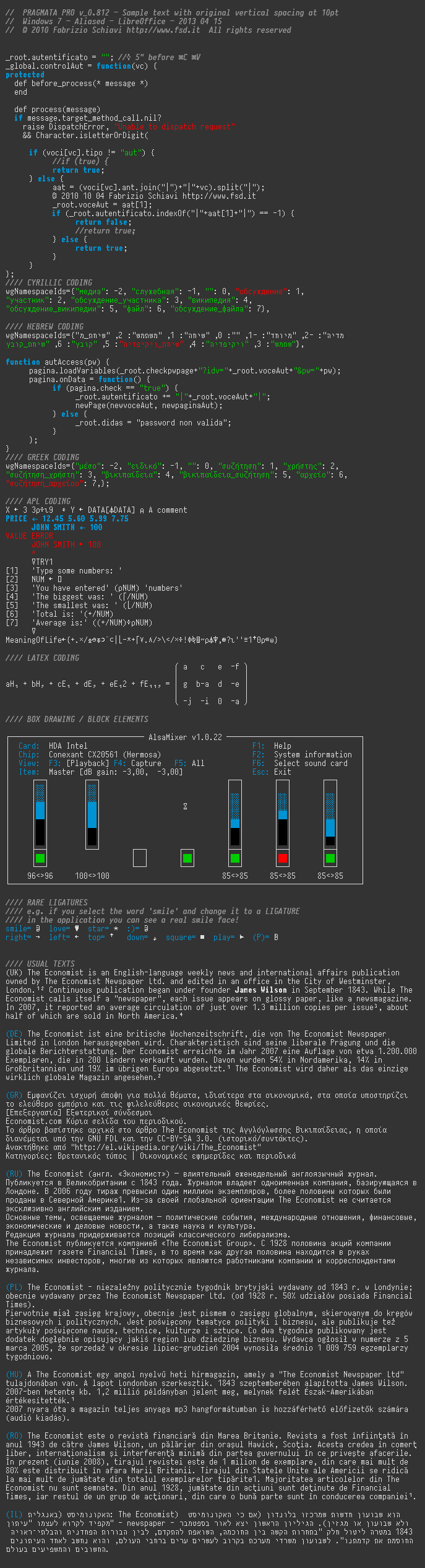
PragmataPro sample text in Windows at 10 pt aliased

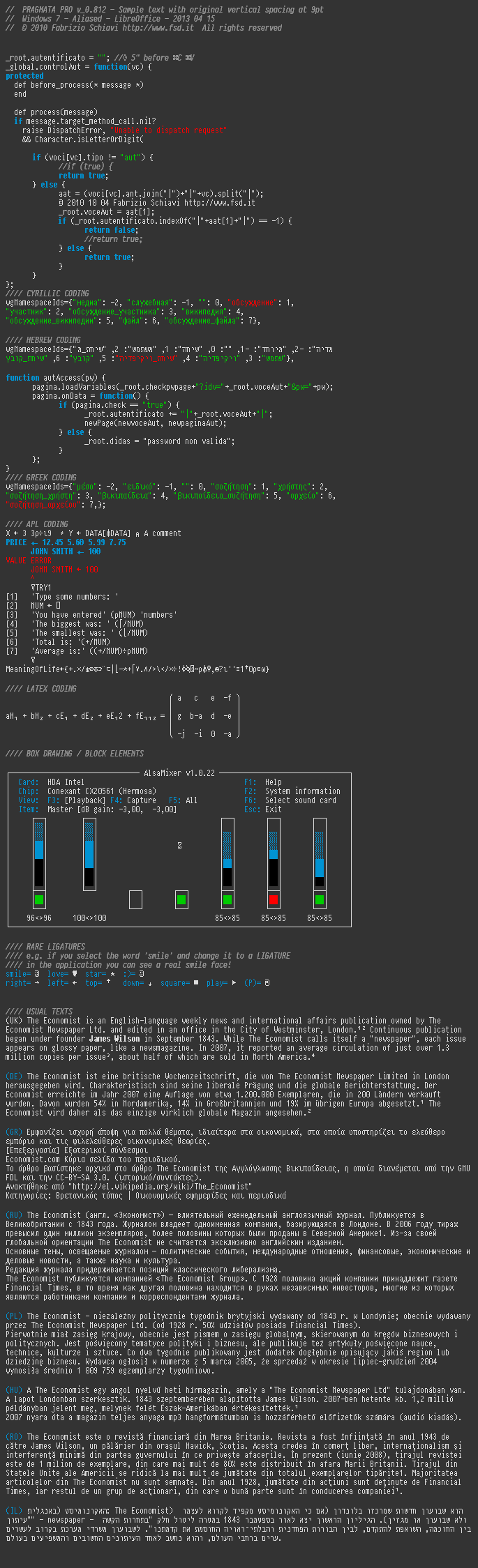
PragmataPro sample text in Windows at 09 pt aliased

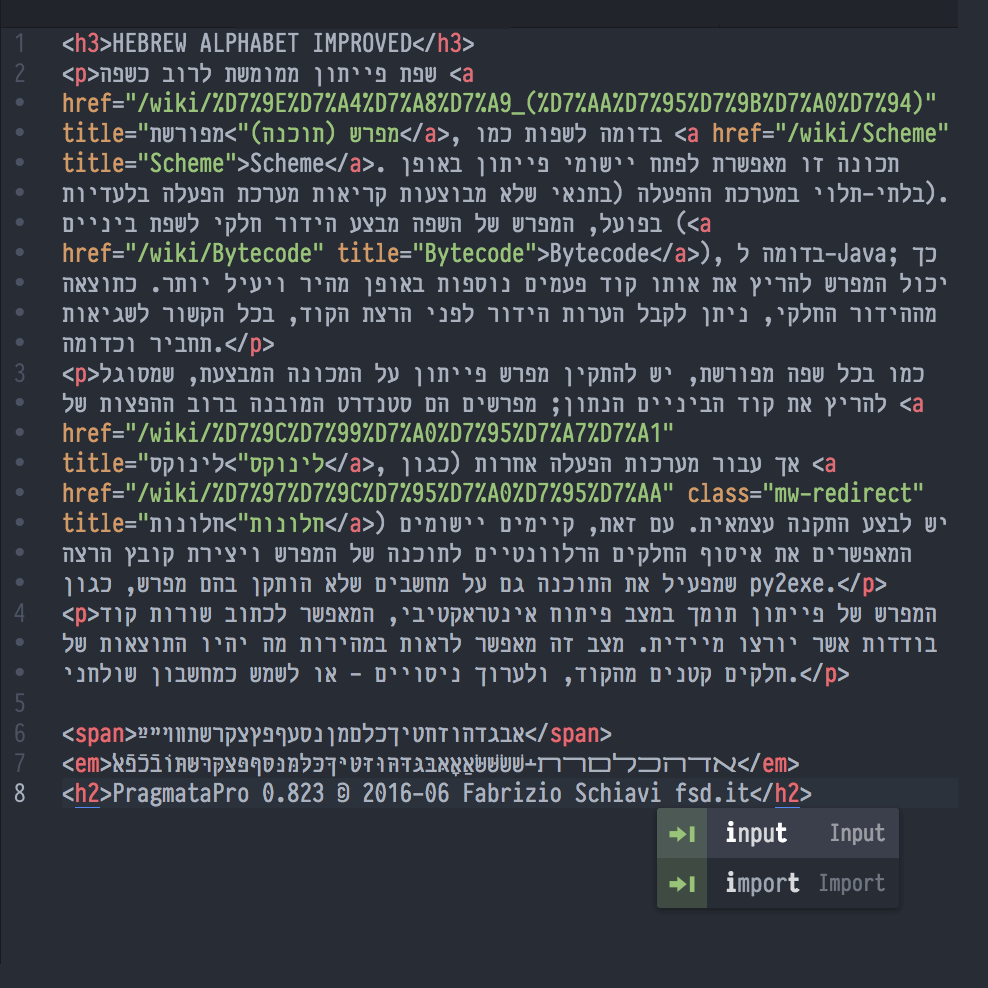
PragmataPro Hebrew sample

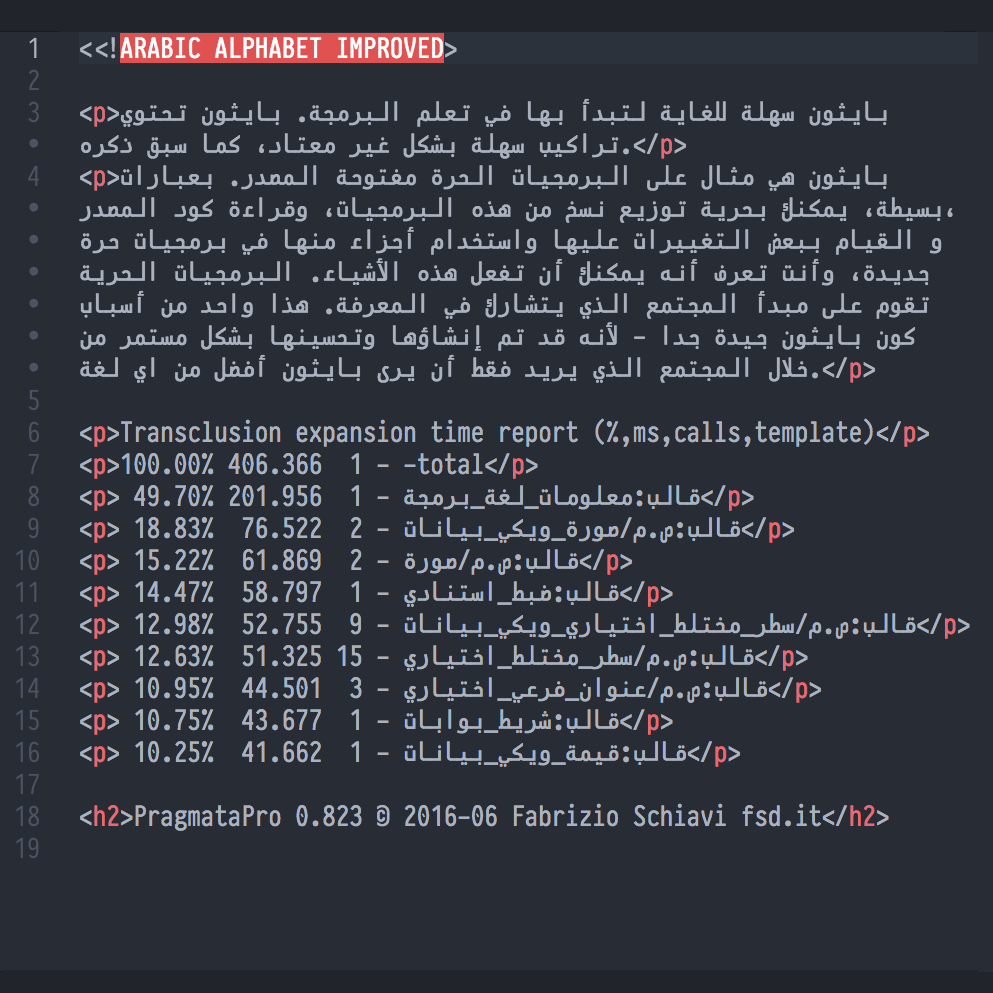
PragmataPro Arabic sample

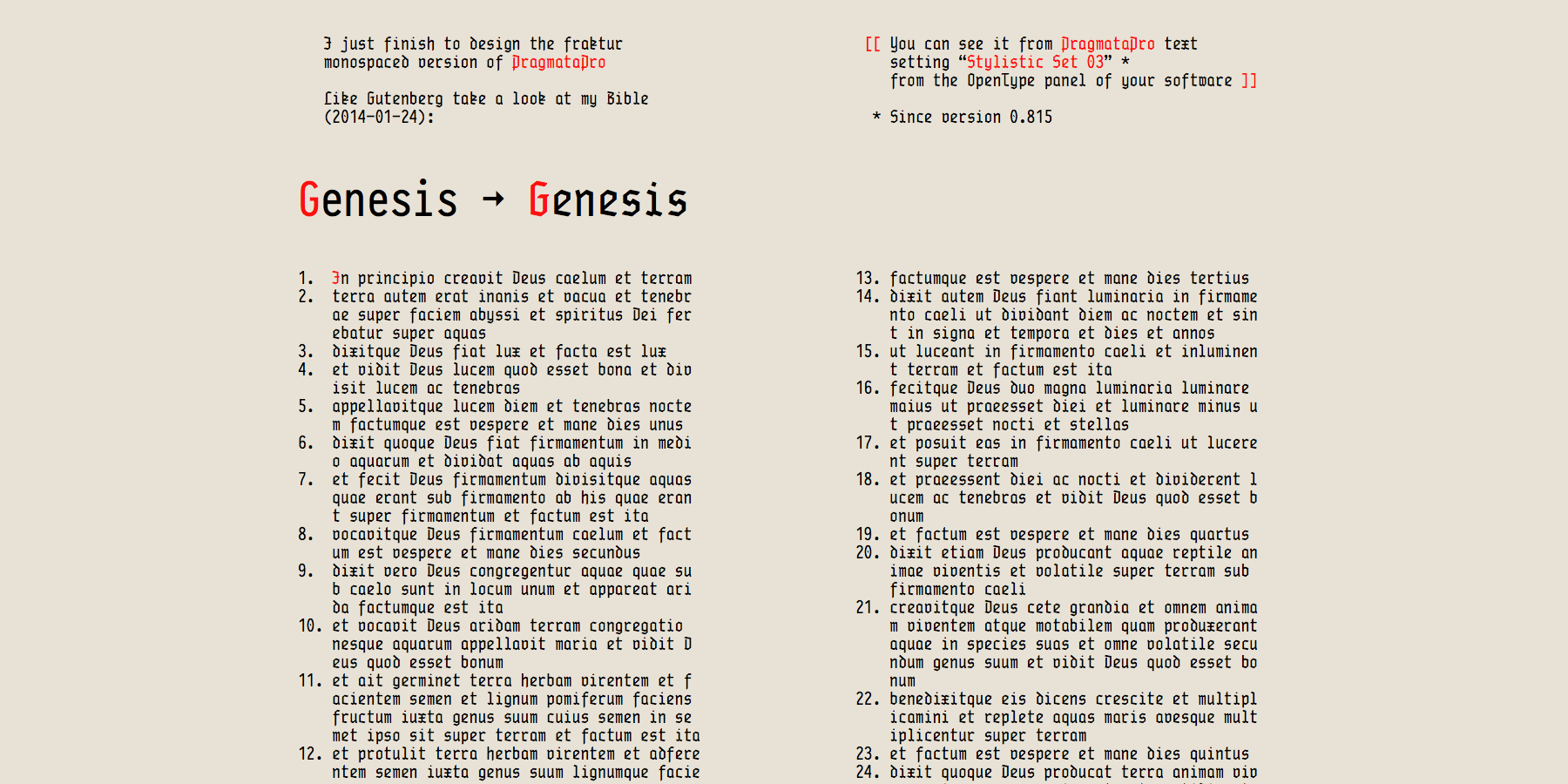
PragmataPro Fraktur available as OpenType feature Sylistic set 03 sample

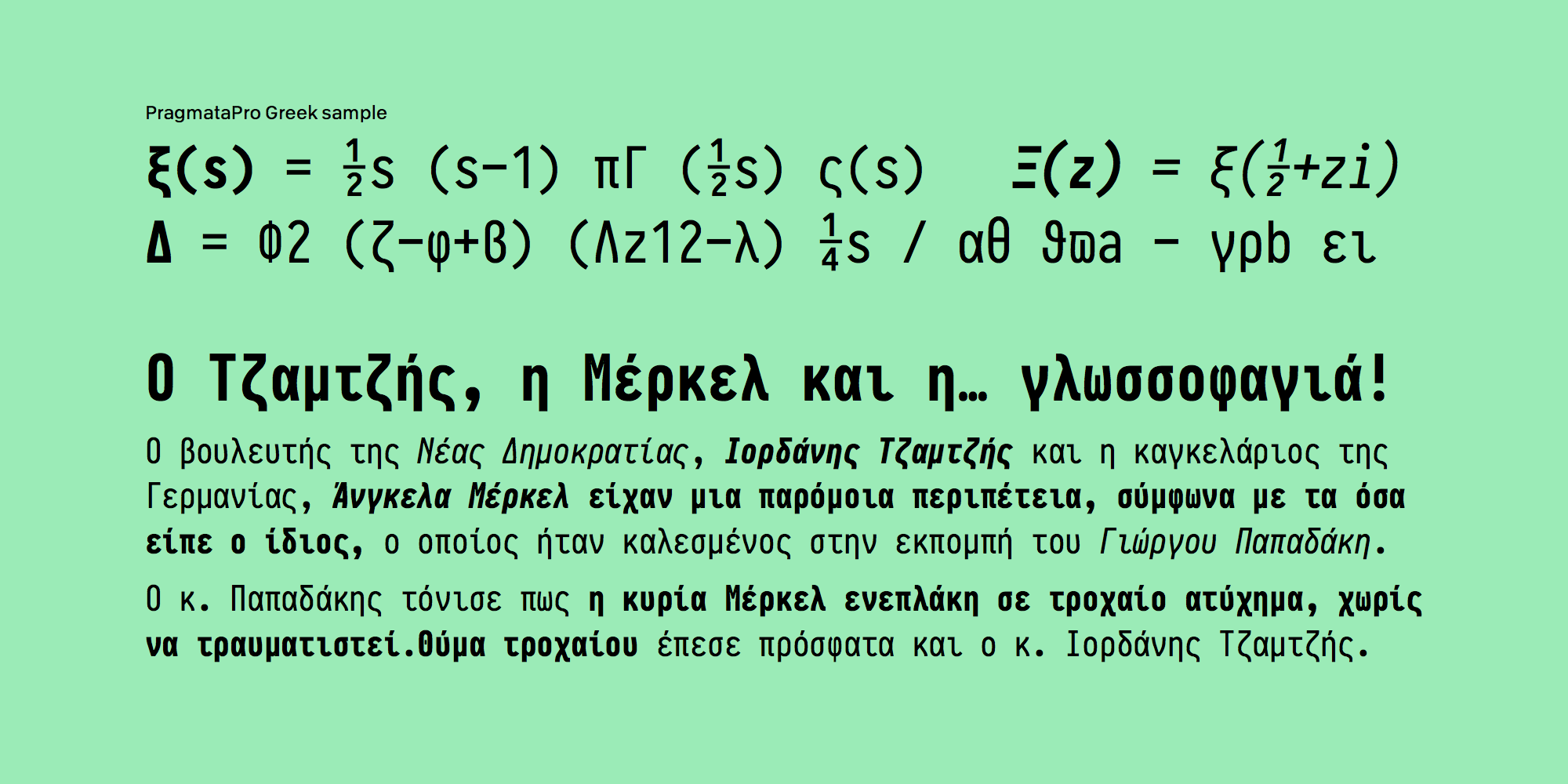
PragmataPro Greek sample

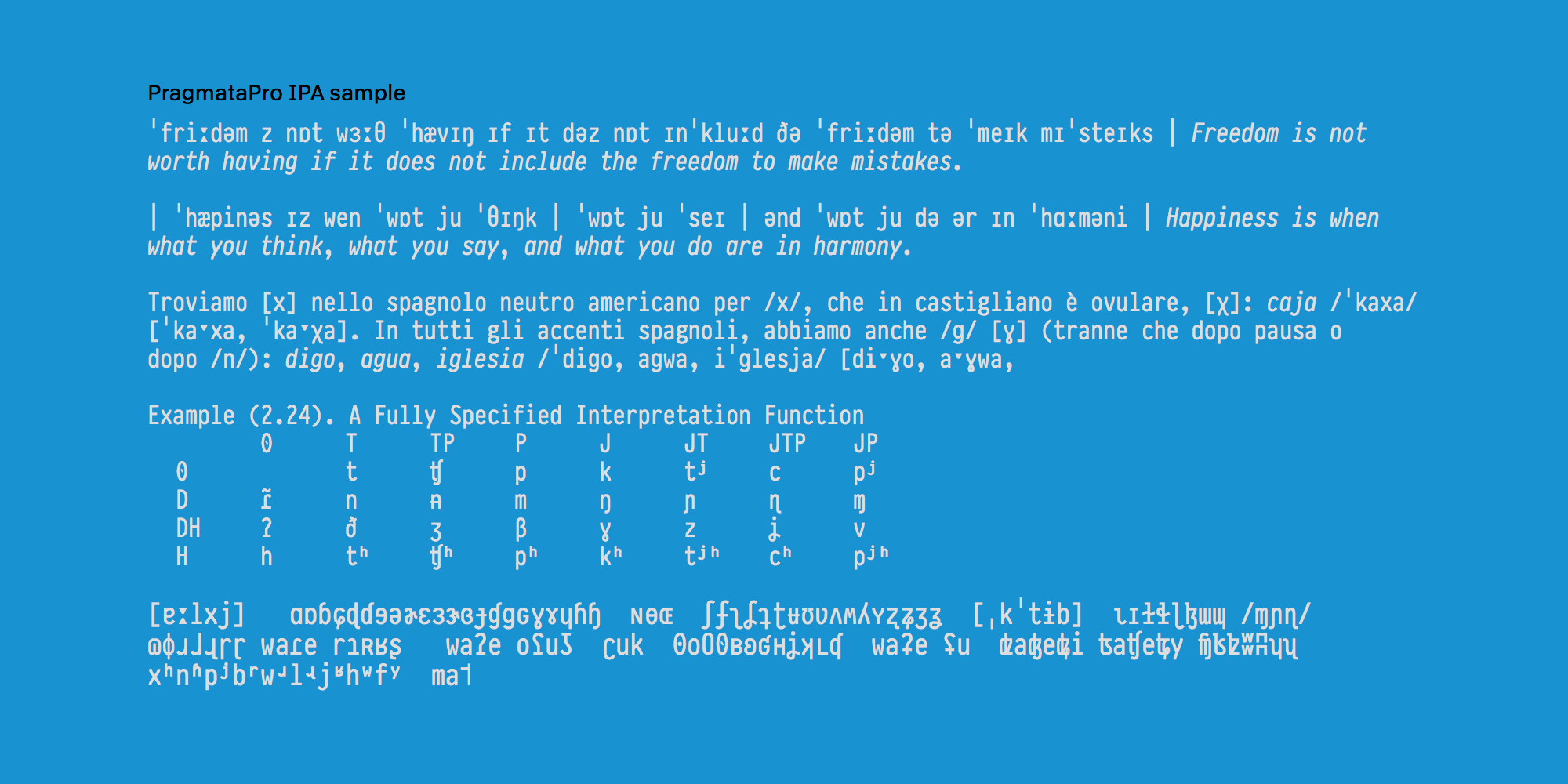
PragmataPro International Phonetic Alphabet sample

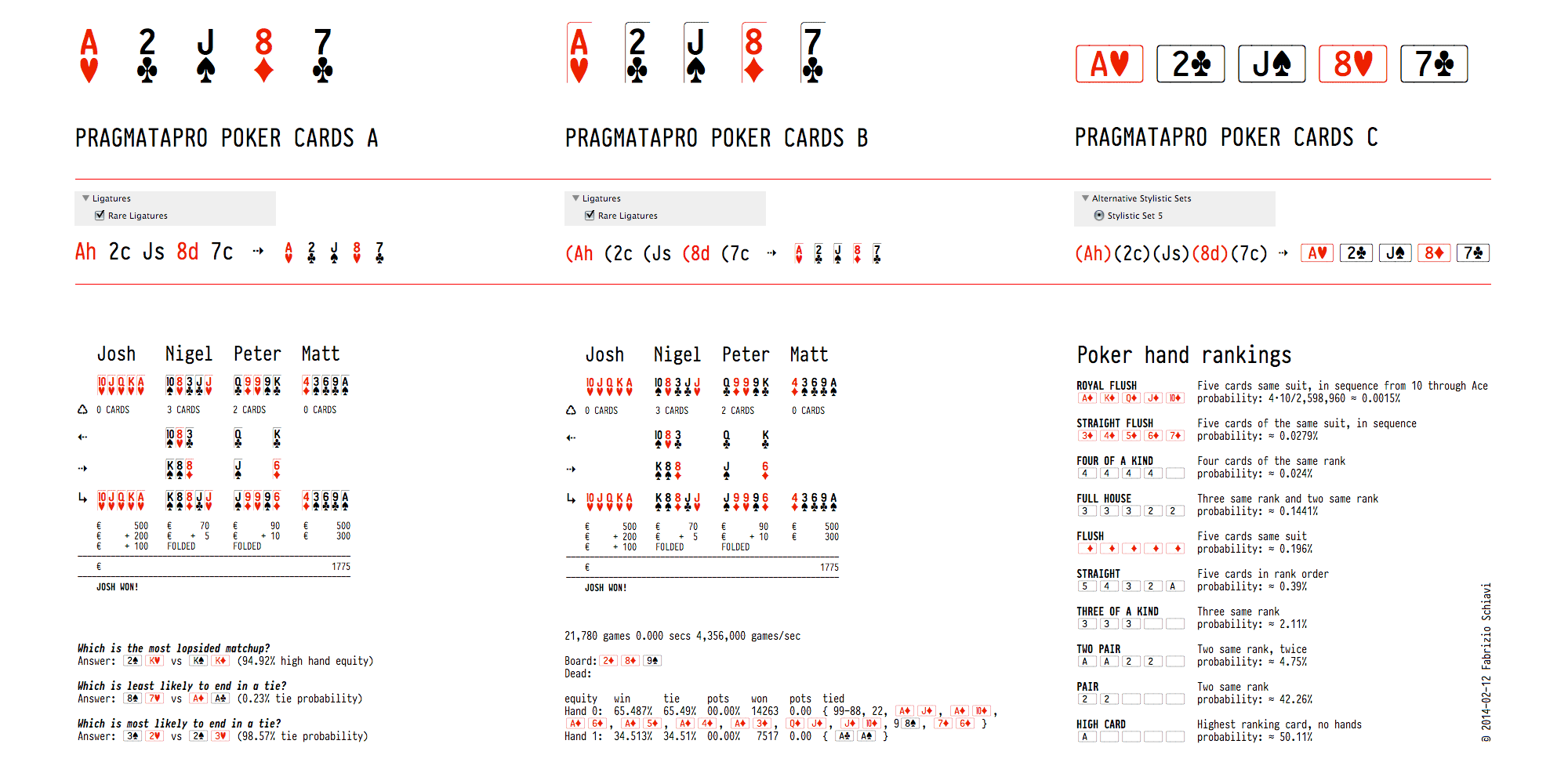
PragmataPro solutions for Poker Cards

== See also ==
- Iosevka, a Monospaced font with a design similar to PragmataPro
