= Prestige Elite =

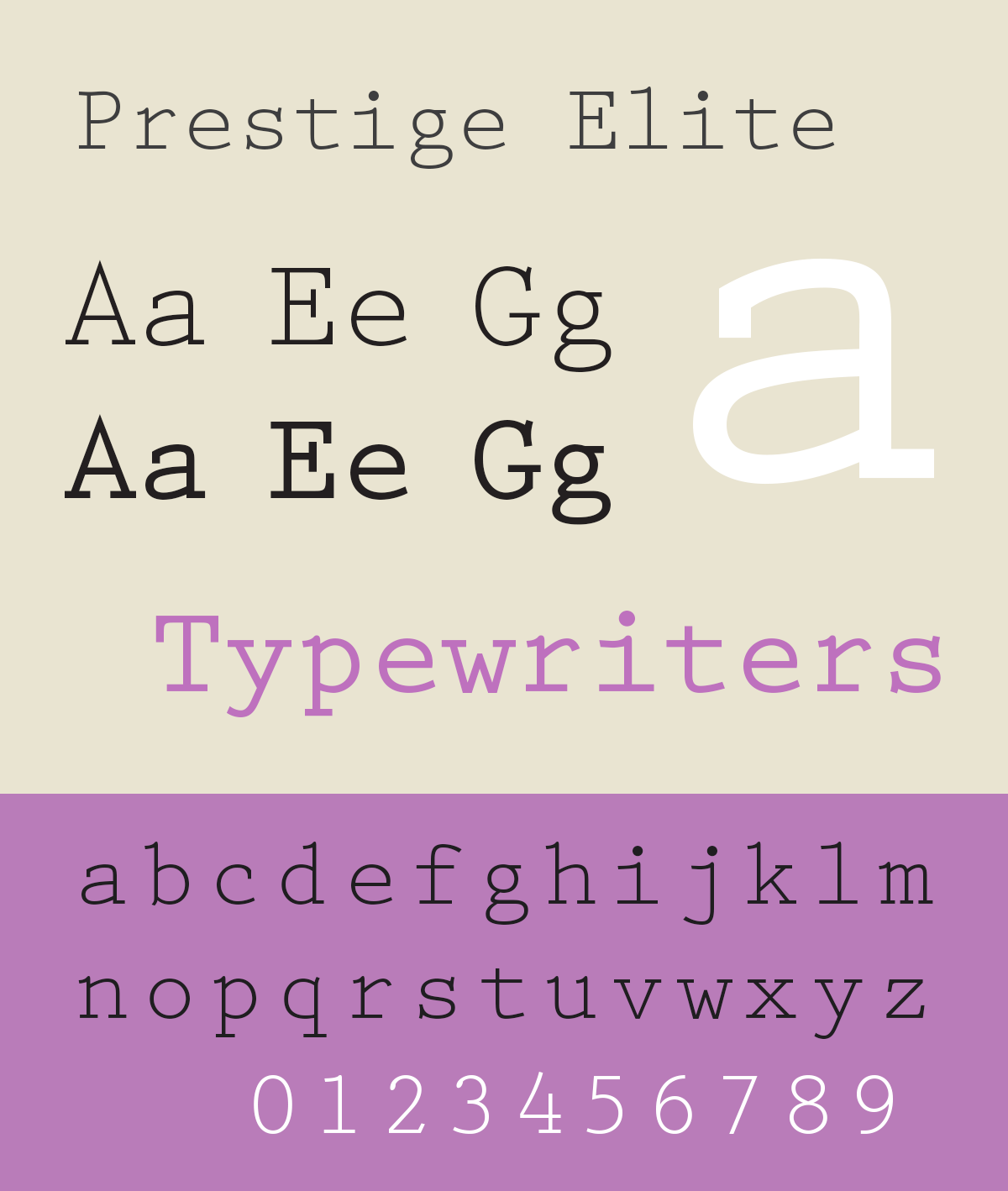
- Category: Monospaced
- Designer: Clayton Smith
- Foundry: IBM
- Date created: 1953
- Re-issuing foundries: Adobe Inc.
- Sample

Prestige Elite, also known simply as Prestige or Elite, is a monospaced typeface.

It was created by Clayton Smith in 1953 for IBM. Along with Courier, it was extremely popular for use in electric typewriters, especially the IBM Selectric typewriter. Unlike Courier, however, its popularity has not extended into the computer age; while versions of Prestige Elite fonts can be purchased for computer use from several digital foundries, they are not in wide use.
