= Raph Levien =

American software developer (born 1970)

- Born: Enkhuizen, Netherlands
- Citizenship: American
- Education: University of California, Berkeley
- Occupation: Programmer
- Known for: Advogato
- Children: 2
- Website: www.levien.com

Raphael Linus Levien (also known as Raph Levien) is a software developer, a member of the free software developer community, through his creation of the Advogato virtual community and his work with the free software branch of Ghostscript. From 2007 until 2018, and from 2021 until 2025, he was employed at Google. He holds a PhD in computer science from UC Berkeley. He also made a computer-assisted proof system similar to Metamath: Ghilbert. In April 2016, Levien announced a text editor made as a "20% Project" (Google allows some employees to spend 20% of their working hours developing their own projects): Xi.

== Imaging and typography ==
The primary focus of Levien's work and research is in the varied areas regarding the theory of imaging—that is, rendering pictures and fonts for electronic display, which in addition to being aesthetically and mathematically important also contribute to the accessibility and search-openness of the web.

Levien has written several papers documenting his research in halftoning technology, which has been implemented in the Gimp-Print free software package, as well as by several commercial implementations. He also created Gill, the GNOME desktop illustration application which aimed at supporting the W3C SVG standard for Vector Graphics. He states it was named after Eric Gill, the English type designer responsible for the Gill Sans, Perpetua and Joanna fonts. Direct development on Gill ceased around the year 2000, but a fork of its codebase has evolved to Sodipodi, and through it to Inkscape.

In 2009, Levien completed a PhD thesis entitled 'From Spiral to Spline: Optimal Techniques in Interactive Curve Design' and published a standalone essay on the mathematical history of Elastica. He calls the Elastica "A beautiful family of curves based on beautiful mathematics and a rich and fascinating history."

Beginning in 2010, his work with Google largely focused on introducing high-quality, open licensed, well organized webfonts to the internet through Google's webfont API. Here, his experience with typographical technology, history and industry helped to shape the development of this growing resource, though he has since moved on from the project to work on Android fonts and text layout.

One of his own fonts, Inconsolata (named in 2009 as one of the ten best programming fonts by Hivelogic, and generally known for its clean lines and elegant design) is now available within the Google library. Regarding this font and his curves work in general, Levien had to say, "And, in fact, I don't just use the Euler spirals, I use a mixture of curves (my package is called Spiro, which is kind of an abbreviation for polynomial spirals). Most Inconsolata (the monospaced font mentioned above) is drawn using G4-continuous splines, which are a very close approximation to the Minimum Variation Curve of Henry Moreton. I now think that's overkill, and G2-continuous splines (the Euler spiral ones) are plenty, and could be done with fewer points."

== Advogato ==
In November 1999, Levien founded Advogato, a social website for the free software community, to test his ideas of attack-resistant trust metrics and to provide a development-focused forum for the free software community that was free of the kind of commercial motivations of such sites as SourceForge.

The site has been successful from the point of view of the first criterion, surviving many attacks aimed at subverting the attack metric, made both by developers trying out attacks and by spammers. The site has needed only relatively minor changes to cope with these. The site's trust metric provides, alongside Epinions, one of the two most important datasets used in the empirical analysis of trust metrics and reputation systems. Levien observed that Google's PageRank algorithm can be understood to be an attack-resistant trust metric rather similar to that behind Advogato.

The site has had less success in recent years and currently hosts less discussion than at its peak as developers have moved from forums to weblogs. Due to this, Advogato has added a syndication feature that includes the weblogs of its current certified developer base.

== Activism in GPL-licensed software and encryption legislation ==
Levien played a small part in precipitating the relaxation of the US crypto export legislation, by filing for a Commodities Jurisdiction Request for a T-shirt containing an implementation of the RSA encryption algorithm, in four lines of Perl. At the time (1995), the code on the T-shirt would have been regarded as a munition by the United States and other NATO governments.

ZD-Net's Interactive week summarised the issue that patents pose to the free software community:

Levien recognizes the paradox: On one hand, he made money from forcing everyone who used his patented ideas to give him royalties. On the other, he shared the source code of several programs and recognized how the cooperation helped him and others. The two models were in conflict.

As a resolution to this conflict, in March 2000, Levien made a patent grant of his patent portfolio to the GPL community.

== Personal life ==
He is divorced, with two sons: Alan and Max. He is a member of the Berkeley Monthly Meeting of the Religious Society of Friends (Quakers). In the book TeX People: Interviews from the world of TeX, Levien notes, "I was born in Enkhuizen, the Netherlands, and moved to Virginia when I was three, so I don't really speak Dutch or anything but I do find myself with a liking for herring."

== Bibliography ==
- Raph Levien (2004). Attack Resistant Trust Metrics. Early draft of abandoned PhD manuscript.
- Raph Levien (2007). Lessons From Advogato (video) (abstract). Google Tech Talks, June 25, 2007.
