= Subjective logic =

Type of probabilistic logic

Subjective logic is a type of probabilistic logic that explicitly takes epistemic uncertainty and source trust into account. In general, subjective logic is suitable for modeling and analysing situations involving uncertainty and relatively unreliable sources. For example, it can be used for modeling and analysing trust networks and Bayesian networks.

Arguments in subjective logic are subjective opinions about state variables which can take values from a domain (aka state space), where a state value can be thought of as a proposition which can be true or false. A binomial opinion applies to a binary state variable, and can be represented as a Beta PDF (Probability Density Function). A multinomial opinion applies to a state variable of multiple possible values, and can be represented as a Dirichlet PDF (Probability Density Function). Through the correspondence between opinions and Beta/Dirichlet distributions, subjective logic provides an algebra for these functions. Opinions are also related to the belief representation in Dempster–Shafer belief theory.

A philosophical aspect of the human condition is that nobody can ever determine with absolute certainty whether a proposition about the world is true or false, because our imperfect senses only provide indirect access to the real world, i.e. to what Kant calls das Ding an sich (the thing-in-itself). In addition, whenever the truth of a proposition is expressed, it is always done by an individual, and it can never be considered to represent a general and objective belief. These philosophical ideas are directly reflected in the mathematical formalism of subjective logic.

== Subjective opinions ==
Subjective opinions express subjective beliefs about the truth of state values/propositions with degrees of epistemic uncertainty, and can explicitly indicate the source of belief whenever required. An opinion is usually denoted as $\omega^{A}_{X}$ where $A\,\!$ is the source of the opinion, and $X\,\!$ is the state variable to which the opinion applies. The variable $X\,\!$ can take values from a domain (also called state space) e.g. denoted as $\mathbb{X}$. The values of a domain are assumed to be exhaustive and mutually disjoint, and sources are assumed to have a common semantic interpretation of a domain. The source and variable are attributes of an opinion. Indication of the source can be omitted whenever irrelevant.

=== Binomial opinions ===
Let $x\,\!$ be a state value in a binary domain. A binomial opinion about the truth of state value $x\,\!$ is the ordered quadruple $\omega_{x} = (b_x,d_x,u_x,a_x)\,\!$ where:

$b_x\,\!$: belief mass	is the belief that $x\,\!$ is true.
$d_x\,\!$: disbelief mass	is the belief that $x\,\!$ is false.
$u_x\,\!$: uncertainty mass	is the amount of uncommitted belief, also interpreted as epistemic uncertainty.
$a_x\,\!$: base rate	is the prior probability in the absence of belief or disbelief.

These components satisfy $b_x+d_x+u_x=1\,\!$ and $b_x,d_x,u_x,a_x \in [0,1]\,\!$. The characteristics of various opinion classes are listed below.

An opinion	where $b_x=1\,\!$	is an absolute opinion which is equivalent to Boolean TRUE,
	where $d_x=1\,\!$	is an absolute opinion which is equivalent to Boolean FALSE,
	where $b_x + d_x =1\,\!$	is a dogmatic opinion which is equivalent to a traditional probability,
	where $b_x + d_x < 1\,\!$	is an uncertain opinion which expresses degrees of epistemic uncertainty, and
	where $b_x + d_x = 0\,\!$	is a vacuous opinion which expresses total epistemic uncertainty or total vacuity of belief.

The projected probability of a binomial opinion is defined as $\mathrm{P}_{x}=b_{x} + a_{x} u_{x}\,\!$.

Example binomial opinions with corresponding Beta PDFs

Binomial opinions can be represented on an equilateral triangle as shown on figure. A point inside the triangle represents a $(b_x,d_x,u_x)\,\!$ triple. The b,d,u-axes run from one edge to the opposite vertex indicated by the Belief, Disbelief or Uncertainty label. For example, a strong positive opinion is represented by a point towards the bottom right Belief vertex. The base rate, also called the prior probability, is shown as a red pointer along the base line, and the projected probability, $\mathrm{P}_{x}\,\!$, is formed by projecting the opinion onto the base, parallel to the base rate projector line. Opinions about three values/propositions X, Y and Z are visualized on the triangle to the left, and their equivalent Beta PDFs (Probability Density Functions) are visualized on the plots to the right. The numerical values and verbal qualitative descriptions of each opinion are also shown.

The Beta PDF is normally denoted as $\mathrm{Beta}(p(x);\alpha,\beta)\,\!$ where $\alpha\,\!$ and $\beta\,\!$ are its two strength parameters. The Beta PDF of a binomial opinion $\omega_x = (b_x,d_x,u_x,a_x)\,\!$ is the function
$$\mathrm{Beta}(p(x);\alpha,\beta) \mbox{ where }
\begin{cases}
\alpha &= \frac{Wb_x}{u_x}+Wa_x\\
\beta  &= \frac{Wd_x}{u_x}+W(1-a_x)
\end{cases}
\,\!$$
where $W$ is the noninformative prior weight, also called a unit of evidence, normally set to $W=2$.

The $\alpha$ and $\beta$ parameters can simply be represented by the prior probability $a_x$ and the observation evidence $(r_x, s_x)$ where $r_x$ is the amount of positive evidence and $s_x$ is the amount of negative evidence:
$$\begin{cases}
\alpha = r_x + a_x W,\\
\beta = s_x + (1-a_x) W.
\end{cases}$$

=== Multinomial opinions ===
Let $X\,\!$ be a state variable which can take state values $x\in\mathbb{X}\,\!$. A multinomial opinion over $X\,\!$ is the tuple $\omega_{X}=(b_{X}, u_{X}, a_{X})\,\!$, where $b_{X}\,\!$ is a belief mass distribution over the possible state values of $X\,\!$, $u_{X}\,\!$ is the uncertainty mass, and $a_{X}\,\!$ is the prior (base rate) probability distribution over the possible state values of $X\,\!$. These parameters satisfy $u_{X}+\sum b_{X}(x) = 1\,\!$ and $\sum a_{X}(x) = 1\,\!$ as well as $b_{X}(x),u_{X},a_{X}(x) \in [0,1]\,\!$.

Trinomial opinions can be simply visualised as points inside a tetrahedron, but opinions with dimensions larger than trinomial do not lend themselves to simple visualisation.

Dirichlet PDFs are normally denoted as $\mathrm{Dir}(p_{X};\alpha_{X})\,\!$ where $p_{X}\,\!$ is a probability distribution over the state values of $X$, and $\alpha_{X}\,\!$ are the strength parameters.

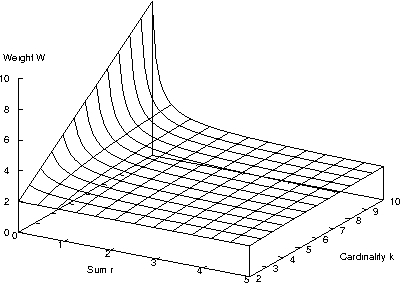
3D curve plot of the noninformative prior weight, with the convergence constant $C_W = 2$

The Dirichlet PDF of a multinomial opinion $\omega_{X} = (b_{X},u_{X},a_{X})\,\!$ is the function $\mathrm{Dir}(p_{X};\alpha_{X})$ where the strength parameters are given by $\alpha_{X}(x) = \frac{Wb_{X}(x)}{u_{X}}+Wa_{X}(x)\,\!$, and where $W$ is the noninformative prior weight. The $\alpha_X$ strength parameters are a function of the prior probability distribution $a_X$ and the observation evidence $r_X$ through the equation: $\alpha_{X}(x) = r_{X}(x) + a_{X}(x) W.$ Here, $r_{X}(x) \geq 0$ is the amount of evidence in support of $x.$

In the multinomial case, the noninformative prior weight $W$ should be dynamic as a function of the cardinality $k$ of the state space $\mathbb{X}$, the amount of evidence $r_{X}$, and the convergence constant $C_W$ though the equation:$\;\;$ $W = \frac{k(1 + C_{W} \sum r_X(x))}{1 + k \sum r_X(x)}.$

The equation has the property that $W=k$ when $\alpha_{X} = a_{X}$ (vacuous opinion), and rapidly converges to the constant $C_W$ with increasing evidence strength (belief mass). The convergence constant is typically set to $C_W = 2$, which is the case illustrated on the 3D curve plot in the figure. The advantage of a dynamic $W$ is to have a uniform Dirichlet for vacuous opinions with a uniform base rate distribution $a_{X}$, while at the same time ensuring that any Dirichlet with arbitrarily large cardinality is equally sensitive to new evidence, as would be expected.

== Operators ==
Most operators in the table below are generalisations of binary logic and probability operators. For example addition is simply a generalisation of addition of probabilities. Some operators are only meaningful for combining binomial opinions, and some also apply to multinomial opinion. Most operators are binary, but complement is unary, and abduction is ternary. See the referenced publications for mathematical details of each operator.

Subjective logic operators, notations, and corresponding propositional/binary logic operators
Subjective logic operator	Operator notation	Propositional/binary logic operator
Addition	$\omega^{A}_{x\cup y}=\omega^{A}_{x}+\omega^{A}_{y}\,\!$	Union
Subtraction	$\omega^{A}_{x\backslash y}=\omega^{A}_{x}-\omega^{A}_{y}\,\!$	Difference
Multiplication	$\omega^A_{x\land y}=\omega^A_x \cdot \omega^A_y\,\!$	Conjunction / AND
Division	$\omega^A_{x\widetilde{\land} y}=\omega^A_x/\omega^A_y\,\!$	Unconjunction / UN-AND
Comultiplication	$\omega^{A}_{x\lor y}=\omega^{A}_{x}\sqcup \omega^{A}_{y}\,\!$	Disjunction / OR
Codivision	$\omega^{A}_{x\widetilde{\lor} y}=\omega^{A}_{x}\;\widetilde{\sqcup}\;\omega^{A}_{y}\,\!$	Undisjunction / UN-OR
Complement	$\omega^{A}_{\overline{x}}\;\;=\lnot\omega^{A}_{x}\,\!$	NOT
Deduction	$\omega^{A}_{Y\|X}= \omega^{A}_{Y|X}\circledcirc \omega^{A}_{X}\,\!$	Modus ponens
Subjective Bayes' theorem	$\omega^{A}_{X\tilde{|}Y}=\omega^{A}_{Y|X}\;\widetilde{\phi\,}\;a_{X}\,\!$	Contraposition
Abduction	$\omega^{A}_{X\widetilde{\|}Y}=\omega^{A}_{Y|X}\;\widetilde{\circledcirc}\;(a_{X},\omega^{A}_{Y})\,\!$	Modus tollens
Transitivity / discounting	$\omega^{A:B}_{X}=\omega^{A}_{B}\otimes\omega^{B}_{X}\,\!$	n.a.
Cumulative fusion	$\omega^{A\diamond B}_{X}=\omega^{A}_{X}\oplus \omega^{B}_{X}\,\!$	n.a.
Constraint fusion	$\omega^{A\& B}_{X}=\omega^{A}_{X}\;\odot\; \omega^{B}_{X}\,\!$	n.a.

Transitive source combination can be denoted in a compact or expanded form. For example, the transitive trust path from analyst/source $A\,\!$ via source $B\,\!$ to the variable $X\,\!$ can be denoted as $[A;B,X]\,\!$ in compact form, or as $[A;B]:[B,X]\,\!$ in expanded form. Here, $[A;B]\,\!$ expresses that $A$ has some trust/distrust in source $B$, whereas $[B,X]\,\!$ expresses that $B$ has an opinion about the state of variable $X$ which is given as an advice to $A$. The expanded form is the most general, and corresponds directly to the way subjective logic expressions are formed with operators.

== Properties ==
In case the argument opinions are equivalent to Boolean TRUE or FALSE, the result of any subjective logic operator is always equal to that of the corresponding propositional/binary logic operator. Similarly, when the argument opinions are equivalent to traditional probabilities, the result of any subjective logic operator is always equal to that of the corresponding probability operator (when it exists).

In case the argument opinions contain degrees of uncertainty, the operators involving multiplication and division (including deduction, abduction and Bayes' theorem) will produce derived opinions that always have correct projected probability but possibly with approximate variance when seen as Beta/Dirichlet PDFs. All other operators produce opinions where the projected probabilities and the variance are always analytically correct.

Different logic formulas that traditionally are equivalent in propositional logic do not necessarily have equal opinions. For example $\omega_{x\land (y\lor z)} \neq \omega_{(x \land y)\lor (x\land z)}\,\!$ in general although the distributivity of conjunction over disjunction, expressed as $x\land (y\lor z) \Leftrightarrow (x \land y)\lor (x\land z)\,\!$, holds in binary propositional logic. This is no surprise as the corresponding probability operators are also non-distributive. However, multiplication is distributive over addition, as expressed by $\omega_{x\land (y\cup z)} = \omega_{(x \land y)\cup (x\land z)}\,\!$. De Morgan's laws are also satisfied as e.g. expressed by $\omega_{\overline{x\land y}} = \omega_{\overline{x} \lor \overline{y}}\,\!$.

Subjective logic allows very efficient computation of mathematically complex models. This is possible by approximation of the analytically correct functions. While it is relatively simple to analytically multiply two Beta PDFs in the form of a joint Beta PDF, anything more complex than that quickly becomes intractable. When combining two Beta PDFs with some operator/connective, the analytical result is not always a Beta PDF and can involve hypergeometric series. In such cases, subjective logic always approximates the result as an opinion that is equivalent to a Beta PDF.

== Applications ==
Subjective logic is applicable when the situation to be analysed is characterised by considerable epistemic uncertainty due to incomplete knowledge. In this way, subjective logic becomes a probabilistic logic for epistemic-uncertain probabilities. The advantage is that uncertainty is preserved throughout the analysis and is made explicit in the results so that it is possible to distinguish between certain and uncertain conclusions.

The modelling of trust networks and Bayesian networks are typical applications of subjective logic.

=== Subjective trust networks ===
Subjective trust network

Subjective trust networks can be modelled with a combination of the transitivity and fusion operators. Let $[A;B]\,\!$ express the referral trust edge from $A\,\!$ to $B\,\!$, and let $[B,X]\,\!$ express the belief edge from $B\,\!$ to $X\,\!$. A subjective trust network can for example be expressed as $([A;B]:[B,X])\diamond([A;C]:[C,X])\,\!$ as illustrated in the figure.

The indices 1, 2 and 3 indicate the chronological order in which the trust edges and advice are formed. Thus, given the set of trust edges with index 1, the origin trustor $A\,\!$ receives advice from $B\,\!$ and $C\,\!$, and is thereby able to derive belief in variable $X\,\!$. By expressing each trust edge and belief edge as an opinion, it is possible for $A\,\!$ to derive belief in $X\,\!$ expressed as $\omega^{A}_{X} = \omega^{[A;B]\diamond[A;C]}_{X} = (\omega^{A}_{B}\otimes \omega^{B}_{X}) \oplus (\omega^{A}_{C}\otimes \omega^{C}_{X})\,\!$.

Trust networks can express the reliability of information sources, and can be used to determine subjective opinions about variables that the sources provide information about.

Evidence-based subjective logic (EBSL) describes an alternative trust-network computation, where the transitivity of opinions (discounting) is handled by applying weights to the evidence underlying the opinions.

=== Subjective Bayesian networks ===
In the Bayesian network on the figure below, $X\,\!$ and $Y\,\!$ are parent variables and $Z\,\!$ is the child variable. The analyst must learn the set of joint conditional opinions $\omega_{Z|XY}$ in order to apply the deduction operator and derive the marginal opinion $\omega_{Z\|XY}$ on the variable $Z$. The conditional opinions express a conditional relationship between the parent variables and the child variable.

Subjective Bayesian network

The deduced opinion is computed as $\omega_{Z\|XY} = \omega_{Z|XY} \circledcirc \omega_{XY}$. The joint evidence opinion $\omega_{XY}$ can be computed as the product of independent evidence opinions on $X\,\!$ and $Y\,\!$, or as the joint product of partially dependent evidence opinions.

=== Subjective networks ===
Subjective network

The combination of a subjective trust network and a subjective Bayesian network is a subjective network. The subjective trust network can be used to obtain from various sources the opinions to be used as input opinions to the subjective Bayesian network, as illustrated in the figure.

Traditional Bayesian network typically do not take into account the reliability of the sources. In subjective networks, the trust in sources is explicitly taken into account.
