= Letter Gothic =

Monospaced sans-serif typeface

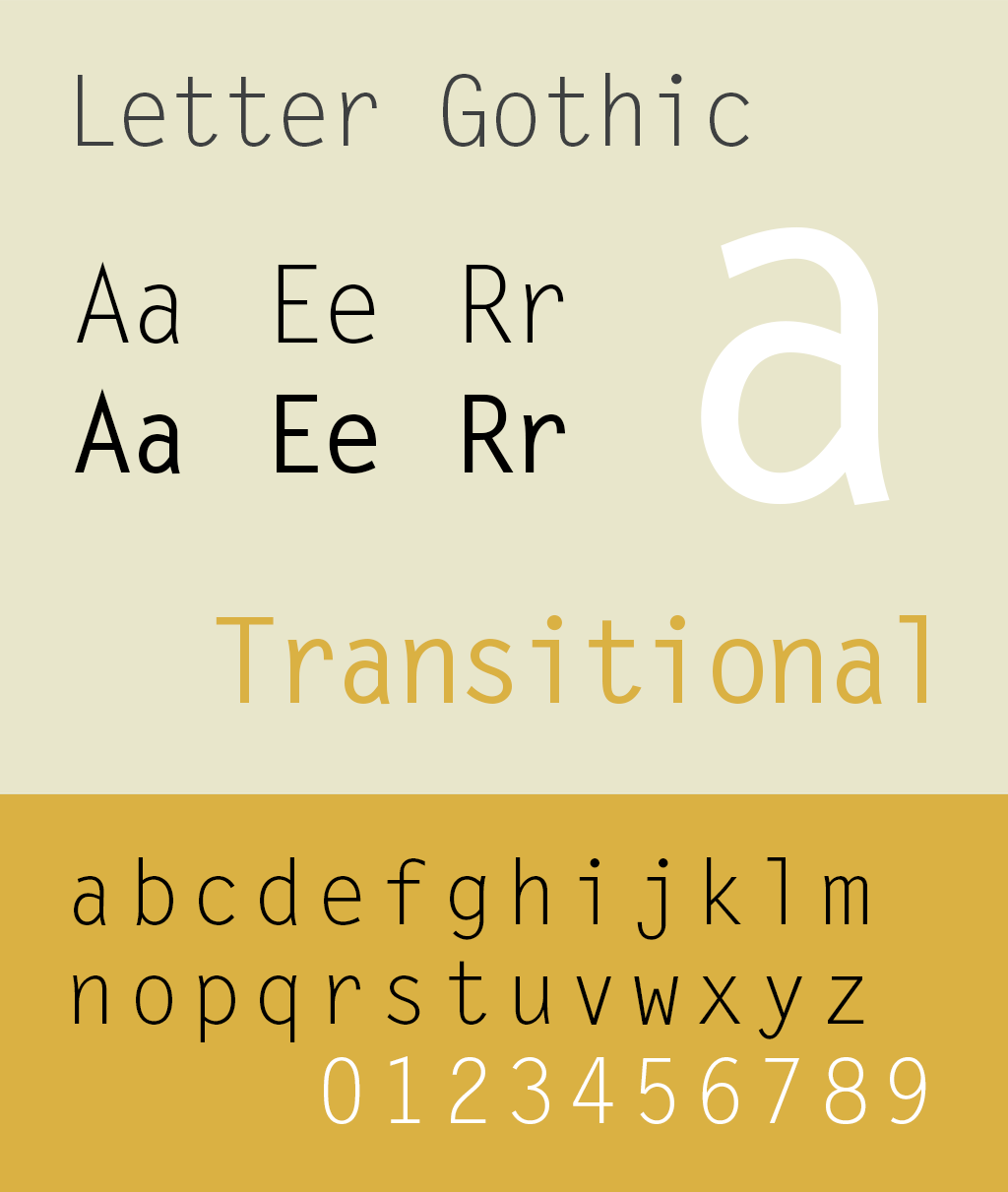
- Category: Sans-serif
- Classification: Neo-Grotesque
- Designer(s): Roger Roberson
- Foundry: IBM
- Date released: 1956
- Re-issuing foundries: Adobe Inc., ParaType
- Design based on: Optima

Letter Gothic is a monospaced sans-serif typeface. It was created between 1956 and 1962 by Roger Roberson for IBM in their Lexington, Kentucky, plant, and was inspired by the original drawings for Optima. It was initially intended to be used in IBM's Selectric typewriters. It is readable and is recommended for technical documentation and for sheets including columnar data.

Gayaneh Bagdasaryan designed a proportional font called New Letter Gothic, based on Letter Gothic, for ParaType.

Letter Gothic was included in Windows 95. It was replaced by Andalé Mono in Windows 98 and in 2001, Windows XP replaced it with Lucida Console.
