= MyFonts =

Digital fonts distributor

- Owner: Monotype Corporation
- Website: www.myfonts.com
- Launched: September 1999
- Current status: Active

MyFonts is a digital fonts distributor, based in Woburn, Massachusetts. It was created by Bitstream Inc., launched in September 1999 (during the ATypI conference in Boston), and started selling fonts in March 2000.

In November 2011, Monotype Imaging announced plans to acquire MyFonts and the other font-related parts of Bitstream for $50 million in cash. The acquisition was concluded in March 2012.
