= Fixedsys =

- Category: Sans-serif
- Designer: Bitstream Inc.
- Commissioned by: Microsoft
- Foundry: Microsoft
- Date created: 1984
- Date released: 1985
- Also known as: SysFixed
- Sample
- See all characters

Fixedsys is a family of raster monospaced fonts. The name means fixed system, because its glyphs are monospaced, or fixed-width (although bolded characters are wider than non-bolded, unlike fully monospaced fonts such as Courier). It is the oldest font in Microsoft Windows, and was the system font in Windows 1.0 and 2.0, where it was simply named System. For Windows 3.x, the system font was changed to a proportional sans-serif font named System, but Fixedsys remained the default font in Notepad.

The Fixedsys fonts family contains fonts encoded in several Windows code pages, with multiple resolutions of the font for each code page. Fixedsys fonts of different code pages have different point sizes.

The glyphs for the upper areas of each one appear to be drawn separately, not taken from a single master set, as there are visible differences in the appearance of various visually similar characters that are shared between the code pages.

Though Fixedsys is a sans-serif font, it is vaguely similar in appearance to the hardware text mode font of most IBM-compatible PCs, though not as similar as certain sizes of the Terminal fonts seen in Windows.

In Windows 95, Windows 98, and Windows Me, Fixedsys remained the default font for Notepad. This font was superseded by Lucida Console in Notepad for later versions of Windows. In Windows 95, this default font cannot be changed. Fixedsys of other code pages can be selected by specifying script settings in the font selection dialogue, but all code pages can be chosen.

Due to its clean style and easy readability, it has enjoyed some popularity with the programming community, even giving rise to an imitation font – Fixedsys Excelsior – which, based on the original Fixedsys typeface, also includes a large number of Unicode script ranges.

There is a certain amount of similarity between Fixedsys and Chicago, the system typeface on the Apple Macintosh from 1984 to 1997. The key difference is that Chicago is a proportional typeface while Fixedsys is monospaced. A smaller CGA version of this font also exists, with some characters bearing a resemblance to the IBM 8×8 CGA font. The EGA version is nearly identical to the CGA version, only differing in a small number of characters.

According to a string embedded in the .FON file (which is viewable with a hex editor or with a typeface editor such as Fony), this font was designed in 1984 by Bitstream Inc., but the high-resolution 8514/a version (used in modern versions of Windows as the high-resolution variant, which is larger and looks different from the VGA version) was designed in 1987 by Microsoft.

== Example ==
The following is lorem ipsum text rendered in Fixedsys.

== See also ==
- Terminal (typeface)
- MS Sans Serif
