= Menlo (typeface) =

Monospaced typeface

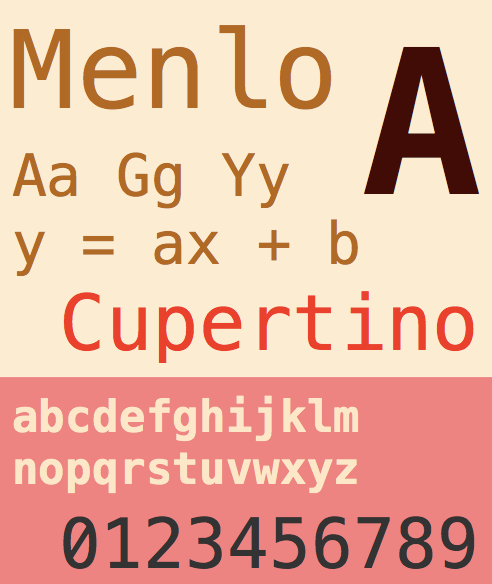
- Category: Sans-serif
- Classification: Monospace
- Designer: Jim Lyles
- Foundry: Apple Inc.
- Date released: 2009

Menlo is a monospaced sans-serif typeface designed by Jim Lyles and Charles Bigelow. The typeface was first shipped with Mac OS X Snow Leopard in August 2009. Menlo superseded the Monaco typeface, which had long been the default monospaced typeface on macOS. Menlo is based on the open source font Bitstream Vera and the public domain font DejaVu.

== Replacement ==
Menlo was replaced as the system monospaced font in Mac OS X 10.11 El Capitan in September 2015, with a new Apple-made monospaced font called SF Mono, a monospaced variant of the San Francisco family of fonts that Apple has created as part of its corporate identity.

== See also ==
- Typography of Apple Inc.
