= Terminal (typeface) =

First line of coding in most computers

- Designer: Bitstream Inc.
- Commissioned by: Microsoft
- Foundry: Microsoft
- Date created: 1984; 42 years ago

The font Terminal at various resolutions

Terminal is a family of monospaced raster typefaces. It is relatively small compared with Courier. It uses crossed zeros, and is designed to approximate the font normally used in MS-DOS or other text-based consoles such as on Linux. In Windows, it is the default font in the Command Prompt in Windows 7 and earlier.

The Terminal font family contains fonts encoded in various code pages, with multiple resolutions of the font for each code page. Fixedsys fonts of different code pages have different point sizes. Under the DBCS Windows environment, specifying the Terminal font may also cause the application to use non-Terminal fonts when displaying text.

In Windows 2000 or later, changing the script setting in an application's font dialogue (e.g., Notepad, WordPad) causes the Terminal font to look completely different, even under same font size. Similarly, changing the language setting for Windows applications that do not support Unicode will alter the appearance of OEM/DOS scripted Terminal font.

Terminal is based upon code page 437 (or other codepages with suitable language, such as CP850) and is not aligned with Unicode. Most of the characters in Terminal are the same as the characters used in code page 437, but some of the characters (mostly Greek letters and some box-drawing characters) may or may not have been replaced by additional accented letters, depending on the codepage of the system. However, if a font size of 5 pt. is used, the Greek letters and box-drawing characters are still viewable.

According to some strings hidden in the file, the original Terminal font size (9x12) was designed in 1984 by Bitstream Inc. The DOSAPP.FON, which is used by Windows for showing MS-DOS applications in the window, is the same as Terminal, but with new sizes added. This typeface was designed in 1991 by Microsoft Corporation. The CGA and EGA versions of the Terminal font exist, but they share similarities with the IBM CGA font, with slight differences in characters.

== See also ==
- Consolas
- Fixedsys
