= Monaco (typeface) =

Monospaced sans-serif typeface

- Category: Sans-serif
- Classification: Monospace
- Designer: Susan Kare
- Foundry: Apple Inc.
- Date created: 1983
- Date released: 1984

Monaco is a monospaced sans-serif typeface designed by Susan Kare, Kris Holmes, and Charles Bigelow. It ships with macOS and has been present in all releases of Macintosh system software since the first Macintosh in 1984. Characters are distinct, and it is difficult to confuse 0 (figure zero) and O (uppercase O), or 1 (figure one), | (vertical bar), I (uppercase i) and l (lowercase L). A unique feature of the font is the high curvature of its parentheses as well as the width of its square brackets, the result of these being that an empty pair of parentheses or square brackets will strongly resemble a circle or square, respectively.

Monaco has been released in at least four forms.

- The outline form of Monaco is loosely similar to Lucida Mono and created as a TrueType font for System 6 and 7.
- The original bitmap Monaco came in 9- and 12-point sizes. Both had different letter shapes from the outline form and, until the release of Mac OS 8.5 in 1998, did not have the above-mentioned distinguishing marks.
- A revision of bitmap Monaco ships with Mac OS 8.5 onward that, among other cosmetic changes, adds some disambiguation features to 0 (figure zero) and l (lowercase L) that were previously absent. It still appears in the ROMs of even New World Macs, and is still available in recent macOS releases (size 9, with disabled antialiasing).
- MacsBug uses a modification of bitmap Monaco that adds disambiguation features to I (uppercase i) and 0 (figure zero).

The original Monaco 9-point bitmap font was designed so that when a Compact Macintosh window was displayed full screen, such as for a terminal emulator program, it would result in a standard text user interface display of 80 columns by 25 lines.

With the August 2009 release of Mac OS X 10.6 Snow Leopard, Menlo was introduced as the default monospaced font instead of Monaco in Terminal and Xcode, However, Monaco remains a part of macOS. Monaco is the default font in the current Python IDLE when used on a Mac running OS X El Capitan.

Furthermore, in September 2015, Mac OS X 10.11 El Capitan introduced SF Mono, a monospaced variant of the San Francisco font family, as the default monospaced font instead of Menlo.

As of MacOS Sequoia 15.2, the version of Monaco included is 17.0d1e5.

== See also ==
- Apple typography
- ProFont
