= Open-source Unicode typefaces =

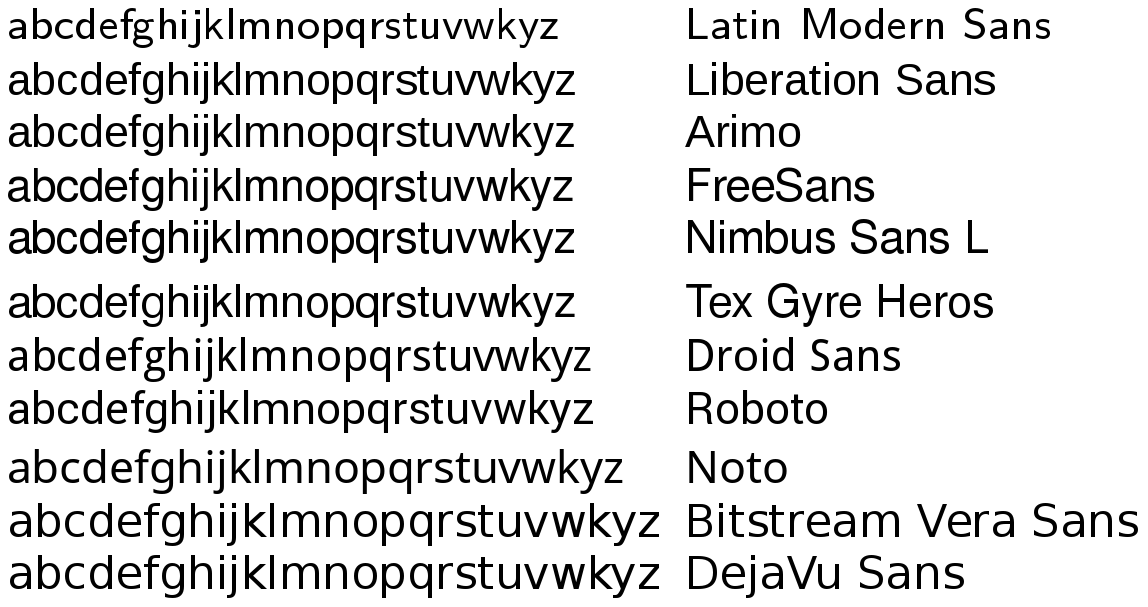
Examples of several libre, sans-serif typefaces

There are Unicode typefaces which are open-source and designed to contain glyphs of all Unicode characters, or at least a broad selection of Unicode scripts. There are also numerous projects aimed at providing only a certain script, such as the Arabeyes Arabic font. The advantage of targeting only some scripts with a font was that certain Unicode characters should be rendered differently depending on which language they are used in, and that a font that only includes the characters a certain user needs will be much smaller in file size compared to one with many glyphs. Unicode fonts in modern formats such as OpenType can in theory cover multiple languages by including multiple glyphs per character, though very few actually cover more than one language's forms of the unified Han characters.

== History ==
=== 20th century ===
==== Fixed ====
The Fixed X11 public-domain core bitmap fonts have provided substantial Unicode coverage since 1997.

==== GNU Unifont ====
GNU Unifont is a bitmap-based font created by Roman Czyborra that is present in most free operating systems and windowing systems such as Linux, XFree86 or the X.Org Server. The font is released under the GNU General Public License Version 2+ with a font embedding exception.

=== 21st century ===
==== 2000s ====
===== Free UCS Outline Fonts =====
The Free UCS Outline Fonts (also known as freefont) is a font collection project. The project was started by Primož Peterlin and is currently administered by Steve White. The aim of this project has been to produce a package of fonts by collecting existing free fonts and special donations, to support as many Unicode characters as possible. The font family is released as GNU FreeFont under the GNU General Public License. It also supports several font formats, including PostScript, TrueType, and OpenType. For this reason the fonts are derived from original work made in FontForge, and stored in .sfd (Spline Font Database) files. The most recent release is from May 2012.

===== SIL fonts =====
SIL International offers a large number of fonts, editors, translation and book production systems as part of their goal to bridge the digital divide to minority languages. This site contains many utilities for Windows systems, including right-to-left editors, keymappers, RTF translators, and high-quality, free Unicode fonts. SIL publish their fonts under their own SIL Open Font License. Typefaces include Charis SIL, Doulos SIL, Gentium and Andika.

===== MPH 2B Damase =====
Mark Williamson's MPH 2B Damase is a free font encoding many non-Latin scripts, including the Unicode 4.1 scripts in the Supplementary Multilingual Plane: Armenian, Cherokee, Coptic, Cypriot Syllabary, Cyrillic, Deseret, Georgian, Glagolitic, Gothic, Greek, Hebrew, Latin, Limbu, Linear B (partial coverage), Old Italic, Old Persian cuneiform, Osmanya, Phoenician, Shavian, Syloti Nagri (no conjuncts), Tai Le (no combining tone marks), Thaana, Tifinagh, Ugaritic, and Vietnamese.

===== IndUni fonts =====
The IndUni fonts are a GPL-licensed font family with many accents and combining characters, especially suitable for Indic, Indian and Nepali (Sanskrit, Prakrit, Hindi) and Middle Eastern languages and Urdu in transliteration. It also includes characters for Avestan and for the Pinyin representation of Chinese, a set of Cyrillic characters and a basic set of Greek letters. The fonts implement almost the whole of the Multilingual European Subset 1 of Unicode. Also provided are keyboard handlers for Windows and the Mac, making input easy.

They are based on fonts designed by URW++ Design and Development Incorporated, and offer lookalikes for Courier, Helvetica, Times, Palatino, and New Century Schoolbook.

==== 2010s ====
===== Noto fonts =====
Noto is a font family designed to cover all the scripts encoded in the Unicode standard. It is designed with the goal of achieving visual harmony (e.g., compatible heights and stroke thicknesses) across multiple languages/scripts. Commissioned by Google, the font is licensed under the SIL Open Font License. Until September 2015, the fonts were under the Apache License 2.0.

===== Cascadia Code =====
Cascadia Code is a purpose-built TrueType font for Windows Terminal, the new command-line interface for Microsoft Windows. It includes programming ligatures and was designed to enhance the look and feel of Windows Terminal, terminal applications and text editors such as Visual Studio and Visual Studio Code. The font is open source under the SIL Open Font License and available on GitHub. It has been bundled with Windows Terminal since version 0.5.2762.0.

==== 2020s ====
===== Kurinto Font Folio =====
Kurinto is a large collection of Pan-Unicode, OFL-licensed TrueType fonts. The intended use-case is academic publishing, especially when authoring in Microsoft Word and publishing to PDF. The primary goal is to address issues when mixing languages using Latin script with secondary languages using other scripts. Most of the italic faces are not true italics; they are slanted versions of the corresponding regular ones (oblique types). However, those of the included "Metric-Compatible Typeface" serifs are (having round letterforms, a Florin sign ƒ, etc).

===== Larabie Fonts =====
In August 2020, Ray Larabie released a library of early fonts from the 1990s, prior to the establishment of his professional digital type firm Typodermic Fonts, into the public domain. Most of the fonts that were released were "experimental, interesting, or simply lousy" and were no longer of any commercial value. Larabie released another batch of fonts into the public domain in November 2022, and another—which included fonts from Typodermic and fonts he considered "good" but did not perform well in sales or downloads—in April 2024. (Larabie retained copyright on other fonts from the Larabie Fonts that he continues to license and sell through Typodermic, and has withheld others that turned out to be derivative works of copyrighted material.) The fonts vary widely in their Unicode coverage.

Larabie had previously released the pan-Unicode "Canada 150" into the public domain as a gesture to the Canadian sesquicentennial in 2017.

== Comparison ==
Font name	License	Date / version	Notes
Amiri Font	OFL	2020-06-02 / 0.113	Digitalization of a Naskh styled Arabic metal typeface by the Bulaq Press of Cairo, Egypt
APL fonts	Public domain	2013-04-20	Designed with the symbols needed for programming with the APL programming language. Contains three fonts, APL385 (monospace), APL2741 (a deprecated italic last updated in 2003) and APL333 (proportional).
BabelStone Han	Arphic Public License	2024-03-15 / 15.1.4	A unicode CJK font with over 41,000 Han characters (hanzi, kanji, hanja), and over 53,000 unicode characters currently.
Bitstream Vera	Bitstream Vera fonts license	2003-04-16 / 1.10	
Canada1500	Public domain (CC0)	2017-06-19 / 1.100	Created by Ray Larabie for the Canadian sesquicentennial; released into the public domain shortly before Canada Day 2017. A pan-Unicode extension of Larabie's "Mesmerize" (itself released into the public domain in 2024), in turn inspired by Kabel and Semplicità.
Cardo	OFL	2011-04-20 / 1.04	Unicode 6 and MUFI v3-compatible
Church Slavonic Fonts in Unicode collection	OFL	2020-09-06 / 2.2	A collection of fonts designed for Cyrillic and Glagolitic scripts used for the (Old) Church Slavonic liturgical language.
CMU family	OFL	2012-08-29 / 0.7.0	An updated version of Computer Modern (CMU is an abbreviation for Computer Modern Unicode).
Culmus collection of fonts	GPL 2 + font exception	2018-09-30 / 0.133	A basic collection of Hebrew fonts aimed at Hebrew-speaking Linux and Unix community
DejaVu fonts	license	2016-07-30 / 2.37	A modification and wide extension of Bitstream Vera fonts
Droid fonts	Apache license	2007	A collection of fonts developed for Google's Android mobile phone operating system
EB Garamond	OFL	2011	
ET Book	MIT	2016-07-08	
Fira Sans	OFL	2018-03-20 / 4.3	Commissioned for Firefox OS
Fixed		1997	The Fixed X11 public-domain core bitmap fonts have provided substantial Unicode coverage since 1997.
Fixedsys Excelsior	public domain	2007 / 3.01	Based on Fixedsys.
Gentium	OFL or BSD-like license	2025-06-02 / 7.000	
Ghostscript	GPL, AFPL, LPPL	2020-03-19 / 9.52	URW ++ Type 1 fonts, a free alternatives to 35 basic PostScript fonts—e.g. Type 1 version of Nimbus Roman No9 L, Nimbus Sans L, Nimbus Mono L, URW Bookman L, URW Gothic L and others
GNU Unifont	GPL-2.0-or-later with Font-exception-2.0	2026-09-16 / 18.0.01	GNU Unifont is a bitmap-based font created by Roman Czyborra that is present in most free operating systems.
"Hanazono Fonts" (in Japanese and English). Archived from the original on 2010-04-12.	(permissive license)	2017-09-04	One of the few free software fonts that includes the whole CJK Unified Ideographs Extension C block, as well as many other (related) CJKV characters, such as the Kangxi Radicals and CJK Radicals Supplement blocks.
Hussar	OFL	2017-02-06 / 2.29 RC2	Loosely based on Spartan. The most recent (2019) general release of Hussar has a somewhat smaller glyph set.
IBM Plex	OFL	2019-06-05 / 2.0	IBM Plex is designed and developed by Mike Abbink at IBM in collaboration with Bold Monday. It is the replacement of Helvetica as the corporate typeface.
Iosevka	OFL	2025 / 32.5.0	A monospaced pan-Unicode font
Jomolhari	OFL		Tibetan script
Junicode	GPL	2018-06-25 / 1.002	
Kelvinch Font	OFL, free for any use	2016-04-18	Most Latin blocks fully populated + Cyrillic, Georgian, Armenian & Runes. Comes in Roman, Italic, Bold & Bold Italic.
Kurinto Font Folio	OFL	2020-07-26 / 2.196	Pan-Unicode, 21 typefaces, 506 fonts, coverage of most of Unicode v12.1 plus many auxiliary scripts including the UCSUR.
Latin Modern	GUST licence		Another derivative of Computer Modern
Lato	OFL	2015-08-06 / 2.015	Covers all Latin alphabets, along with Cyrillic, Greek, and IPA
Liberastika fonts	GPL + font exception		Is a derivative of Liberation fonts with improved Cyrillic
Liberation fonts	OFL	2019-03-04 / 2.00.5	Liberation is the collective name of four TrueType font families: Liberation Sans, Liberation Sans Narrow, Liberation Serif and Liberation Mono. These fonts are metrically compatible with Monotype Corporation's Arial, Arial Narrow, Times New Roman, and Courier New (respectively). Versions since 2.00 use OFL while older versions use GPL + font exception.
Linux Libertine	GPL, OFL	2012-07-06 / 5.3.0	Linux Libertine is a digital typeface created by the Libertine Open Fonts Project, which aims to create free and open alternatives to proprietary typefaces such as Times Roman.
M+ FONTS	OFL		Earlier versions of M+ were released under terms of "unlimited permission."
New Athena Unicode	OFL	2019-12-08 / 5.007	
Noto fonts	OFL		Commissioned by Google
Old Standard TT	GPL, OFL	2011-04-30 / 2.2	A Unicode font family for classical, medieval and Slavic studies; based upon Century — alternative download at fontspace.com An unofficial extension, New Standard, is available at 1001Fonts and includes an expanded character set.
Overpass	OFL		Commissioned by Red Hat as FOSS alternative to Interstate.
Oxygen fonts	GPL + font exception or OFL		Created by the KDE community, this font is optimised for the FreeType font rendering system and works well in all graphical user interfaces, desktops and devices. Alternative download at fontsquirrel.com
Quivira	Public domain	2019 / 4.1	11,053 glyphs, focusing mainly on Western scripts and limited emoji.
Roboto	Apache license	2017-08-03 / 2.138	A collection of fonts developed for Google's Android mobile phone operating system
SIL fonts	OFL		Typefaces include Charis SIL, Doulos SIL and Gentium.
Source Han Sans	OFL	2019	By Adobe
Source Han Serif	OFL	2017	By Adobe
Source Sans Pro and Source Code Pro	OFL	2019	By Adobe
Source Serif Pro	OFL	2019	By Adobe
Soyuz Grotesk	No copyright reserved	2017	Loosely and indirectly based on Helvetica. Primarily Latin and Cyrillic glyphs. The 2024 revision is under copyright with permission required for derivative works and redistribution.
Squarish Sans CT	OFL	2013	A clone of Bank Gothic, developed for the Aleph One game engine. Focuses mainly on Latin glyphs and some symbols.
STIX	OFL	2019 / 2.0.2	Based on Times New Roman.
Symbola	No license, "free for any use"	2021-10 / 14.00	Part of a suite of "Unicode Fonts for Ancient Scripts" that also included Alexander (an italic Garamond), Anaktoria (grecs du roi), and other specialty fonts. The last updated version of the fonts without an end user license agreement were released in February 2018 (Symbola version 10.24). A restrictive personal-use-only, no-derivative-works, no-redistribution license has been attached to all versions since February 2018 (Symbola version 11).
TeX Gyre collection of fonts	GUST licence		
Tuffy	Public domain (PD-self)	2012-06-14 / 1.28	Scratch-built sans-serif font by Thatcher Ulrich, with additional contributions from Michael Everson
Ubuntu Font Family	Ubuntu Font License	2011-03-07 / Ubuntu 11.10	
UniFraktur	OFL	2017-03-19	

== See also ==
- List of typefaces
- Unicode font
- List of CJK fonts
