= GNU FreeFont =

Font family

FreeMono
- Category: Monospace
- Classification: Mechanistic
- Designers: Primož Peterlin, Steve White
- Foundry: GNU Savannah
- Date created: 19 February 2002
- Date released: 7 April 2005
- Characters: 4,160
- Glyphs: 4,178
- License: GPL-3.0-or-later with Font-exception-2.0
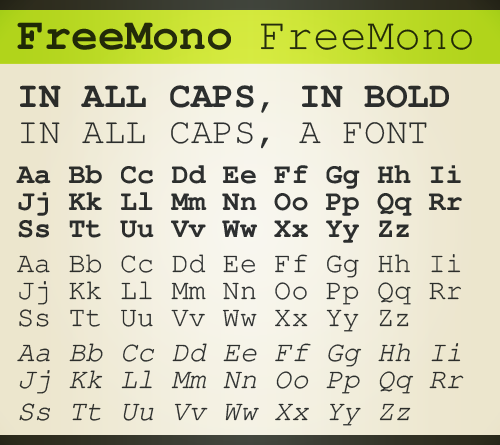
- Sample
- Website: www.gnu.org/software/freefont/
- Latest release version: 20120503
- Latest release date: 3 May 2012

FreeSans
- Category: Sans-serif
- Classification: Neo-grotesque
- Designers: Primož Peterlin, Steve White
- Characters: 4,622
- Glyphs: 6,272
- License: GPL-3.0-or-later with Font-exception-2.0
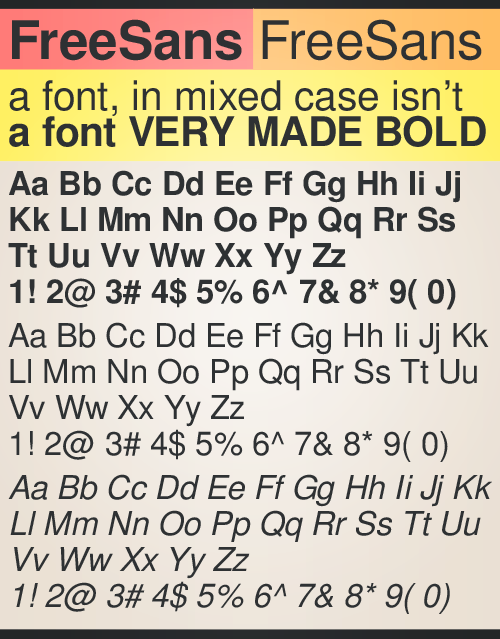
- Sample

FreeSerif
- Category: Serif
- Classification: Transitional
- Designers: Primož Peterlin, Steve White
- Characters: 8,087
- Glyphs: 10,537
- License: GPL-3.0-or-later with Font-exception-2.0
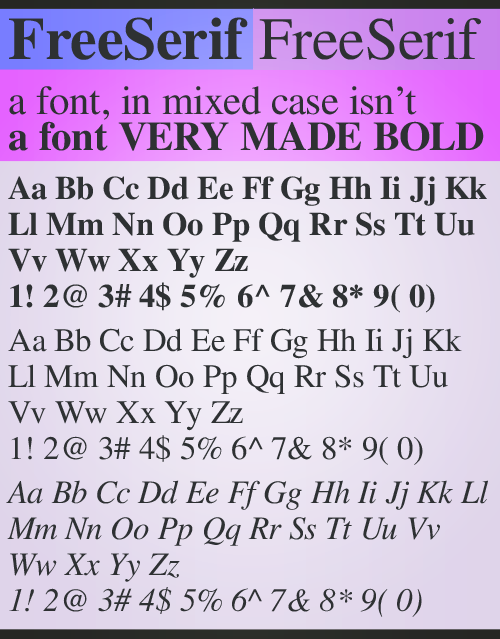
- Sample

GNU FreeFont (also known as Free UCS Outline Fonts) is a family of free OpenType, TrueType and WOFF vector fonts, implementing as much of the Universal Character Set (UCS) as possible, aside from the very large CJK Asian character set. The project was initiated in 2002 by Primož Peterlin and is now maintained by Steve White.

The family includes three faces: FreeMono, FreeSans, and FreeSerif, each in four styles (Regular, Italic/Oblique, Bold, and Bold Italic/Oblique).

The fonts are licensed under the GPL-3.0-or-later license with the Font-exception-2.0, ensuring they may be both freely distributed and embedded or otherwise utilized within a document without the document itself being covered by the GPL. The fonts can be obtained libre from GNU Savannah. They are also packaged on certain Linux distributions, including Ubuntu and Arch Linux.

== Design ==
The glyphs of GNU FreeFont come from many sources, all of which are compatible with the GPL.

The core Latin characters are derived from the Type 1 fonts donated by URW++ to the Ghostscript project. Specifically, the design notes of GNU FreeFont state that:

- FreeSerif is based on URW++ Nimbus Roman No. 9 L, which is similar to Times
- FreeSans is based on URW++ Nimbus Sans L, which is similar to Helvetica
- FreeMono is based on URW++ Nimbus Mono L, which is similar to Courier

The Greek, Cyrillic, Armenian, Hebrew, Arabic, and International Phonetic Alphabet (IPA) characters are partially based on Omega, which is an extension of TeX. The Greek characters are also based on a set of Greek Type 1 fonts compiled by Angelo Haritsis, in addition to Alexey Kryukov's Tempora LCG Unicode. The Cyrillic range also includes Valek Filipov's Gnome Cyrillic and Tempora LCG Unicode. Valek Filippov further added some composite Latin Extended-A glyphs.

The Devanagari range in serif is from the Velthuis TeX font, while the range in sans is based on Gargi; Bengali and Gurmukhi ranges are based on Harsh Kumar's BharatBhasha project and others. The Gujarati and Oriya ranges are based on Samyak fonts. The Ethiopic range is based on the Ethiopic metafont project at the University of Hamburg.

== Unicode coverage ==
Upper case letters of European alphabets in FreeSerif

In the latest release of 2012-05-03, FreeSerif includes 10,537 glyphs, FreeSans includes 6,272 glyphs, and FreeMono includes 4,178 glyphs.

The family covers characters from the following Unicode blocks:

- Basic Latin
- Latin-1 Supplement
- Latin Extended-A
- Latin Extended-B
- International Phonetic Alphabet (IPA) Extensions
- Spacing Modifier Letters
- Combining Diacritical Marks
- Greek
- Cyrillic
- Cyrillic Supplement
- Arabic
- Hebrew
- N'Ko
- Thaana
- Syriac
- Armenian
- Georgian
- Devanagari
- Bengali
- Gujarati
- Gurmukhi
- Oriya
- Sinhala
- Tamil
- Malayalam
- Tai Le
- Ethiopic
- Thai
- Kayah Li
- Cherokee
- Unified Canadian Aboriginal Syllabics
- Hanunóo
- Buginese
- Vai
- Phonetic Extensions
- Phonetic Extensions Supplement
- Diacritical marks
- Cyrillic Extended-B
- Tifinagh
- Osmanya
- Coptic
- Glagolitic
- Gothic
- Ugaritic
- Old Persian
- Phoenician
- Runic
- Braille
- Supplemental Arrows-A
- Latin Extended Additional
- Greek Extended
- General Punctuation
- Super and Sub scripts
- Currency Symbols
- Letterlike Symbols
- Number Forms
- Arrows
- Mathematical Operators
- Miscellaneous Technical Symbols
- Enclosed Alphanumerics
- Box Drawing
- Block Elements
- Geometric Shapes
- Miscellaneous Symbols
- Dingbats
- Alphabetic Presentation Forms
- Vietnamese
- Western music
- Byzantine music
- Mah Jong tiles
- Dominoes

== See also ==
- Free software Unicode fonts
- List of typefaces
- Unicode typefaces
