= Tâi-uân Lô-má-jī Phing-im Hong-àn =

Transcription system

Tâi-uân Tâi-gí Lô-má-jī Phing-im Hong-àn
- Traditional Chinese: 臺灣台語羅馬字拼音方案
- Simplified Chinese: 台湾台语罗马字拼音方案
- Literal meaning: Taiwan Taiwanese (language) Romanization Scheme
Transcriptions
Standard Mandarin
- Hanyu Pinyin: Táiwān Táiyǔ Luómǎzì Pīnyīn Fāng'àn
- Bopomofo: ㄊㄞˊ ㄨㄢ ㄊㄞˊ ㄩˇ ㄌㄨㄛˊ ㄇㄚˇ ㄗˋ ㄆㄧㄣ ㄧㄣ ㄈㄤ ㄢˋ
- Gwoyeu Romatzyh: Tair'uan Taiyeu Luomaatzyh Pin'in Fang'ann
- Wade–Giles: Tʻai^{2}-wan^{1} Tai^{2}-yü^{3} Lo^{2}-ma^{3}-tzu^{4} Pʻin^{1}-in^{1} Fang^{1}-an^{4}
- Tongyong Pinyin: Táiwan Tái-yǔ Luó-mǎ-zìh Pin-yin Fang-àn
- MPS2: Táiwān Táiyǔ Luómǎtz̀ Pīnyīn Fāng'àn
- IPA: [tʰǎɪ.wán tʰǎɪ.ỳ pʰín.ín fáŋ.ân]
Hakka
- Romanization: Thòi-vàn Thòi-ngî Lò-mâ-sṳ Piang-yîm Fông-on
Yue: Cantonese
- Yale Romanization: Tòihwāan Tòiyuh Lòhmáhjih Pingyām Fōng'on
- Jyutping: toi4 waan1 toi4 jyu6 lo4 maa5 zi6 ping3 jam1 fong1 on3
- IPA: [tʰɔj˩ wan˥ tʰɔj˩ jy˨ lɔ˩ ma˩˧ tsi˨ pʰɪŋ˧ jɐm˥ fɔŋ˥ ]
Southern Min
- Hokkien POJ: Tâi-oân Tâi-gí Lô-má-jī Pheng-im Hong-àn
- Tâi-lô: Tâi-uân Tâi-gí Lô-má-jī Phing-im Hong-àn

Tâi-uân Bân-lâm-gí Lô-má-jī Phing-im Hong-àn
- Traditional Chinese: 臺灣閩南語羅馬字拼音方案
- Simplified Chinese: 台湾闽南语罗马字拼音方案
- Literal meaning: Taiwanese Southern Min Romanization Scheme
Transcriptions
Standard Mandarin
- Hanyu Pinyin: Táiwān Mǐnnányǔ Luómǎzì Pīnyīn Fāng'àn
- Bopomofo: ㄊㄞˊ ㄨㄢ ㄇㄧㄣˇ ㄋㄢˊ ㄩˇ ㄌㄨㄛˊ ㄇㄚˇ ㄗˋ ㄆㄧㄣ ㄧㄣ ㄈㄤ ㄢˋ
- Gwoyeu Romatzyh: Tair'uan Miinnanyeu Luomaatzyh Pin'in Fang'ann
- Wade–Giles: Tʻai^{2}-wan^{1} Min^{3}-nan^{2}-yü^{3} Lo^{2}-ma^{3}-tzu^{4} Pʻin^{1}-in^{1} Fang^{1}-an^{4}
- Tongyong Pinyin: Táiwan Mǐn-nán-yǔ Luó-mǎ-zìh Pin-yin Fang-àn
- MPS2: Táiwān Mǐnnányǔ Luómǎtz Pīnyīn Fāng'àn
- IPA: [tʰǎɪ.wán mìn.nǎn.ỳ pʰín.ín fáŋ.ân]
Hakka
- Romanization: Thòi-vàn Men-nàm-ngî Lò-mâ-sṳ Piang-yîm Fông-on
Yue: Cantonese
- Yale Romanization: Tòihwāan Máhnnàahmyuh Lòhmáhjih Pingyām Fōng'on
- Jyutping: toi4 waan1 man5 naam4 jyu6 lo4 maa5 zi6 ping3 jam1 fong1 on3
- IPA: [tʰɔj˩ wan˥ mɐn˩˧ nam˩ jy˨ lɔ˩ ma˩˧ tsi˨ pʰɪŋ˧ jɐm˥ ]
Southern Min
- Hokkien POJ: Tâi-oân Bân-lâm-gí Lô-má-jī Pheng-im Hong-àn
- Tâi-lô: Tâi-uân Bân-lâm-gí Lô-má-jī Phing-im Hong-àn

Tâi-lô
- Traditional Chinese: 臺羅拼音
- Simplified Chinese: 台罗拼音
Transcriptions
Standard Mandarin
- Hanyu Pinyin: Táiluó Pīnyīn
- Bopomofo: ㄊㄞˊ ㄌㄨㄛˊ ㄆㄧㄣ ㄧㄣ
- Gwoyeu Romatzyh: Tairluo Pin'in
- Wade–Giles: Tʻai^{2}-lo^{2} Pʻin^{1}-in^{1}
- Tongyong Pinyin: Tái-luó Pin-yin
- MPS2: Táiluó Pinyin
- IPA: [tʰǎɪ.lwǒ pʰín.ín]
Hakka
- Romanization: Thòi-lò Piang-yîm
Southern Min
- Hokkien POJ: Tâi-lô Pheng-im
- Tâi-lô: Tâi-lô Phing-im

Kàu-io̍k-pōo Lô-má-jī
- Traditional Chinese: 教育部羅馬字
- Simplified Chinese: 教育部罗马字
- Literal meaning: Ministry of Education Romanization
Transcriptions
Standard Mandarin
- Hanyu Pinyin: Jiàoyùbù Luómǎzì
Southern Min
- Hokkien POJ: Kàu-io̍k-pō͘ Lô-má-jī
- Tâi-lô: Kàu-io̍k-pōo Lô-má-jī

The official romanization system for Taiwanese Hokkien (Taigi) in Taiwan is known as Tâi-uân Tâi-gí Lô-má-jī Phing-im Hong-àn, (Note: In local languages: Traditional Chinese script: 臺灣台語羅馬字拼音方案; Mandarin Pinyin: Táiwān Táiyǔ Luómǎzì Pīnyīn Fāng'àn; Hokkien: Tâi-uân Tâi-gí Lô-má-jī Phing-im Hong-àn) often shortened to Tâi-lô. It is derived from Pe̍h-ōe-jī and since 2006 has been one of the phonetic notation systems officially promoted by Taiwan's Ministry of Education. The system is used in the MoE's Dictionary of Frequently-Used Taiwanese Taigi. Its main differences with Pe̍h-ōe-jī are that it uses ts tsh instead of ch chh, u instead of o in vowel combinations such as oa and oe, i instead of e in eng and ek, oo instead of o͘, and nn instead of ⁿ.

Taiwanese Romanization System

== Alphabet ==
The Taiwanese Romanization System uses 16 basic Latin letters (A, B, E, G, H, I, J, K, L, M, N, O, P, S, T, U), 7 digraphs (Kh, Ng, nn, Oo, Ph, Th, Ts) and a trigraph (Tsh). In addition, it uses five diacritics to represent the seven tones.

Capital letter	Lower case	IPA	Letter name (variant 1)	Letter name (variant 2)
A	a	[a]	a	a
B	b	[b]	bi	be
E	e	[e]	e	e
G	g	[ɡ]	gi	ge
H	h	[h, ʔ]	hi	ha
I	i	[i]	i	i
J	j	[d͡z]	ji	je
K	k	[k]	ki	ka
Kh	kh	[kʰ]	khi	kha
L	l	[l]	li	e-luh
M	m	[m]	mi	e-muh
N	n	[n]	ni	e-nuh
Ng	ng	[ŋ]	ngi	nge
NN	nn	[◌̃]	inn	enn
O	o	[o]	o	o
Oo	oo	[ɔ]	oo	oo
P	p	[p]	pi	pe
Ph	ph	[pʰ]	phi	phe
S	s	[s]	si	e-suh
T	t	[t]	ti	te
Th	th	[tʰ]	thi	the
Ts	ts	[t͡s]	tsi	tse
Tsh	tsh	[t͡sʰ]	tshi	tshe
U	u	[u]	u	u

- nn is only used after a vowel to express nasalization, so it only appears capitalized in all-caps texts.
- Palatalization occurs when j, s, ts, tsh are followed by i, so ji, si, tsi, tshi are sometimes considered multigraphs.
- Of the 10 unused basic Latin letters, R is sometimes used to express dialectal vowels (ir and er), while the others (C, D, F, Q, V, W, X, Y, Z) are only used in loanwords.

=== Sample texts ===
Tâi-lô
Pe̍h-uē-jī (PUJ) sī tsı̍t khuán iōng Latin (Lô-má) phìng-im hē-thóng lâi siá Tâi-uân ê gí-giân ê su-bīn bûn-jī. In-uī tong-tshoo sī thuân-kàu-sū ín--jı̍p-lâi ê, sóo-í ia̍h-ū-lâng kā PUJ kiò-tsò Kàu-huē Lô-má-jī, hı̍k-tsiá sī kán-tshing Kàu-lô. Put-jî-kò hiān-tāi ê sú-iōng-tsiá bē-tsió m̄-sī kàu-tôo, kàu-tôo mā tsin tsē bē-hiáu PUJ.
Pe̍h-ōe-jī
Pe̍h-ōe-jī (POJ) sī chı̍t khoán iōng Latin (Lô-má) phèng-im hē-thóng lâi siá Tâi-ôan ê gí-giân ê su-bīn bûn-jī. In-ūi tong-chho͘ sī thôan-kàu-sū ín--jı̍p-lâi ê, só͘-í ia̍h-ū-lâng kā POJ kiò-chò Kàu-hōe Lô-má-jī, he̍k-chiá sī kán-chheng Kàu-lô. Put-jî-kò hiān-tāi ê sú-iōng-chiá bē-chió m̄-sī kàu-tô͘, kàu-tô͘ mā chin chē bē-hiáu POJ.
Hàn-jī
白話字是一款用拉丁（羅馬）拼音系統來寫臺灣的語言的書面文字。因為當初是傳教士引入來的，所以也有人共白話字叫做教會羅馬字，或者是簡稱教羅。不而過現代的使用者袂少毋是教徒，教徒嘛真濟袂曉白話字。
IPA (without tones)
[peʔued͡ʑi (pi o d͡ʑe) ɕi t͡ɕiʔkʰuan ioŋ latin (loma) pʰiŋim hetʰoŋ lai ɕa taiuan e gigiɛn e subin bund͡ʑi ‖ inui toŋt͡sɔ ɕi tʰuankausu ind͡ʑiʔlai e sɔi iaʔulaŋ ka pi o d͡ʑi kiot͡so kauhue lomad͡ʑi hiʔt͡ɕia ɕi kant͡ɕʰiŋ kaulo ‖ puʔd͡ʑiko hiɛntai e suioŋt͡ɕia bet͡ɕio m̩ɕi kautɔ kautɔ ma t͡ɕin t͡se behiau pi o d͡ʑi ‖]

== Values ==
=== Consonants ===
Initials
		Bilabial		Alveolar		Alveolo-palatal		Velar		Glottal
		Voiceless	Voiced	Voiceless	Voiced	Voiceless	Voiced	Voiceless	Voiced	Voiceless
Nasal			m [m] ㄇ 毛(moo)		n [n] ㄋ 耐(nāi)				ng [ŋ] ㄫ 雅(ngá)	
Plosive	Unaspirated	p [p] ㄅ 邊(pian)	b [b] ㆠ 文(bûn)	t [t] ㄉ 地(tē)				k [k] ㄍ 求(kiû)	g [g] ㆣ 語(gí)	
Plosive	Aspirated	ph [pʰ] ㄆ 波(pho)		th [tʰ] ㄊ 他(thann)				kh [kʰ] ㄎ 去(khì)		
Affricate	Unaspirated			ts [ts] ㄗ 曾(tsan)	j [dz] ㆡ 熱(jua̍h)	tsi [tɕ] ㄐ 尖(tsiam)	ji [dʑ] ㆢ 入(ji̍p)			
Affricate	Aspirated			tsh [tsʰ] ㄘ 出(tshut)		tshi [tɕʰ] ㄑ 手(tshiú)				
Fricative				s [s] ㄙ 衫(sann)		si [ɕ] ㄒ 寫(siá)				h [h] ㄏ 喜(hí)
Lateral					l [l] ~ [ɾ] ㄌ 柳(liú)					

Finals
	Bilabial	Alveolar	Velar	Glottal
Nasal consonant	-m [m] ㆬ	-n [n] ㄣ	-ng [ŋ] ㆭ	
Stop consonant	-p [p̚] ㆴ	-t [t̚] ㆵ	-k [k̚] ㆶ	-h [ʔ] ㆷ

Syllabic consonant
	Bilabial	Velar
Nasal	m [m̩] ㆬ 姆(ḿ)	ng [ŋ̍] ㆭ 酸(sng)

=== Vowels & rhymes ===
Simple & Nasal
	Front		Central		Back	
	Simple	Nasal	Simple	Nasal	Simple	Nasal
Close	i [i] ㄧ 衣(i)	inn [ĩ] ㆪ 圓(înn)			u [u] ㄨ 污(u)	unn [ũ] ㆫ 張(tiunn)
Mid	e [e] ㆤ 禮(lé)	enn [ẽ] ㆥ 生(senn)	o [ə] ㄜ 高(ko)		oo [ɔ] ㆦ 烏(oo)	onn [ɔ̃] ㆧ 翁(onn)
Open			a [a] ㄚ 查(tsa)	ann [ã] ㆩ 衫(sann)		

Dialect
Tâi-lô	IPA	Bopomofo
ir	[ɨ]	ㆨ
er	[ə]	ㄜ
ee	[ɛ]	ㄝ
ere	[əe]	ㄜㆤ (Note: In version of Ngoo Siu-le, /ɘe/ [ere] is spelled as [oe] while the Phonetic Symbol "ㄜ" is replaced with "".)

- o pronounced [ə] ㄜ in general dialect in Kaohsiung and Tainan, [o] ㄛ in Taipei.
- -nn forms the nasal vowels
- There is also syllabic m and ng.

Vowel(s)	Open syllabus		Nasal			Plosive				
Vowel(s)	Open syllabus		[m]	[n]	[ŋ]	[p̚]	[t̚]	[k̚]	[ʔ]	
[a]	a	ann	am	an	ang	ap	at	ak	ah	annh
[ai]	ai	ainn							aih	ainnh
[au]	au								auh	
[e]	e	enn							eh	ennh
[i]	i	inn	im	in	ing	ip	it	ik	ih	innh
[ia]	ia	iann	iam	ian	iang	iap	iat	iak	iah	iannh
[iau]	iau	iaunn							iauh	
[iə]	io								ioh	
[iɔ]					iong			iok		
[iu]	iu	iunn							iuh	iunnh

Vowel(s)	Open syllabus		Nasal			Plosive				
Vowel(s)	Open syllabus		[m]	[n]	[ŋ]	[p̚]	[t̚]	[k̚]	[ʔ]	
[ə]	o								oh	
[ɔ]	oo	onn	om		ong	op		ok	ooh	onnh
[u]	u			un			ut		uh	
[ua]	ua	uann		uan			uat		uah	
[uai]	uai	uainn								
[ue]	ue								ueh	
[ui]	ui									
[m̩]	m		－						mh	
[ŋ̍]	ng		－						ngh	

- ing pronounced [ɪəŋ], ik pronounced [ɪək̚].

=== Tones ===
Tone No.	1	2 (= 6)	3	4	5	7	8
Name	陰平	上聲	陰去	陰入	陽平	陽去	陽入
Name	im-pîng	siōng-siann	im-khì	im-ji̍p	iông-pîng	iông-khì	iông-ji̍p
Symbol	None	Acute	Grave	None (-p, -t, -k, -h)	Circumflex	macron	Vertical line above (-p, -t, -k, -h)
Symbol	◌	◌́	◌̀	◌	◌̂	◌̄	◌̍
Pitch	˥	˥˩	˧˩	˧ʔ	˨˦	˧	˥ʔ
Pitch	55	51	31	3ʔ	24	33	5ʔ
Example	tong (東)	tóng (黨)	tòng (棟)	tok (督)	tông (同)	tōng (洞)	to̍k (毒)

A hyphen links elements of a compound word. A double hyphen indicates that the following syllable has a neutral tone and therefore that the preceding syllable does not undergo tone sandhi. In addition to the seven standard tones (1–5, 7 and 8), the sixth tone, which has merged with the second tone in most dialects, may be written with a breve accent ⟨◌̆⟩ where it has not. A ninth tone may be found in some contracted forms (e.g. 昨昏 cha̋ng, 'yesterday'), and the first syllable of some triplicated adjectives (e.g. 紅紅紅 a̋ng-âng-âng, "very red") and some borrowings (e.g. li̋n-jín, 'carrot'), and this can be written with a double acute accent ⟨◌̋⟩.

Licit syllables

	Ø	b	g	h	j	k	kh	l	m	n	ng	p	ph	s	t	th	ts	tsh	
a	a	ba	ga	ha		ka	kha	la	ma	na	nga	pa	pha	sa	ta	tha	tsa	tsha	a
ah	ah	bah		hah		kah	khah	lah		nah		pah	phah	sah	tah	thah	tsah	tshah	ah
ai	ai	bai	gai	hai		kai	khai	lai	mai	nai	ngai	pai	phai	sai	tai	thai	tsai	tshai	ai
ainn	ainn			hainn		kainn	khainn						phainn		tainn		tsainn		ainn
ak	ak	bak	gak	hak		kak	khak	lak				pak	phak	sak	tak	thak	tsak	tshak	ak
am	am		gam	ham		kam	kham	lam						sam	tam	tham	tsam	tsham	am
an	an	ban	gan	han		kan	khan	lan				pan	phan	san	tan	than	tsan	tshan	an
ang	ang	bang	gang	hang		kang	khang	lang				pang	phang	sang	tang	thang	tsang	tshang	ang
ann	ann			hann		kann	khann						phann	sann	tann	thann	tsann	tshann	ann
annh				hannh										sannh					annh
ap	ap			hap		kap	khap	lap						sap	tap	thap	tsap	tshap	ap
at	at	bat		hat		kat	khat	lat				pat		sat	tat	that	tsat	tshat	at
au	au	bau	gau	hau		kau	khau	lau	mau	nau	ngau	pau	phau	sau	tau	thau	tsau	tshau	au
auh						kauh		lauh	mauh	nauh			phauh		tauh			tshauh	auh
e	e	be	ge	he		ke	khe	le	me	ne	nge	pe	phe	se	te	the	tse	tshe	e
eh	eh	beh		heh		keh	kheh	leh	meh	neh	ngeh	peh		seh	teh	theh	tseh	tsheh	eh
enn	enn			henn		kenn	khenn					penn	phenn	senn	tenn	thenn	tsenn	tshenn	enn
ennh				hennh			khennh												ennh
i	i	bi	gi	hi	ji	ki	khi	li	mi	ni		pi	phi	si	ti	thi	tsi	tshi	i
ia	ia		gia	hia	jia	kia	khia		mia	nia	ngia			sia	tia		tsia	tshia	ia
iah	iah		giah	hiah		kiah	khiah	liah				piah	phiah	siah	tiah	thiah	tsiah	tshiah	iah
iak							khiak					piak	phiak	siak	tiak			tshiak	iak
iam	iam		giam	hiam	jiam	kiam	khiam	liam						siam	tiam	thiam	tsiam	tshiam	iam
ian	ian	bian	gian	hian	jian	kian	khian	lian				pian	phian	sian	tian	thian	tsian	tshian	ian
iang	iang		giang	hiang	jiang		khiang	liang				piang	phiang	siang			tsiang	tshiang	iang
iann	iann			hiann		kiann						piann		siann	tiann	thiann	tsiann	tshiann	iann
iannh				hiannh															iannh
iap	iap		giap	hiap	jiap	kiap	khiap	liap						siap	tiap	thiap	tsiap	tshiap	iap
iat	iat	biat	giat	hiat	jiat	kiat	khiat	liat				piat	phiat	siat	tiat	thiat	tsiat	tshiat	iat
iau	iau	biau	giau	hiau	jiau	kiau	khiau	liau	miau	niau	ngiau	piau	phiau	siau	tiau	thiau	tsiau	tshiau	iau
iauh				hiauh			khiauh				ngiauh								iauh
iaunn	iaunn																		iaunn
ih		bih					khih		mih	nih		pih	phih	sih	tih	thih	tsih	tshih	ih
ik	ik	bik	gik	hik		kik		lik				pik	phik	sik	tik	thik	tsik	tshik	ik
im	im		gim	him	jim	kim	khim	lim						sim	tim	thim	tsim	tshim	im
in	in	bin	gin	hin	jin	kin	khin	lin				pin	phin	sin	tin	thin	tsin	tshin	in
ing	ing	bing	ging	hing		king	khing	ling				ping	phing	sing	ting	thing	tsing	tshing	ing
inn	inn			hinn		kinn	khinn							sinn	tinn	thinn	tsinn	tshinn	inn
io	io	bio	gio	hio	jio	kio	khio	lio				pio	phio	sio	tio	thio	tsio	tshio	io
ioh	ioh		gioh	hioh		kioh	khioh	lioh						sioh	tioh		tsioh	tshioh	ioh
iok	iok		giok	hiok	jiok	kiok	khiok	liok						siok	tiok	thiok	tsiok	tshiok	iok
iong	iong		giong	hiong	jiong	kiong	khiong	liong						siong	tiong	thiong	tsiong	tshiong	iong
ip	ip			hip	jip	kip	khip	lip						sip			tsip	tship	ip
it	it	bit		hit	jit	kit	khit					pit	phit	sit	tit		tsit	tshit	it
iu	iu	biu	giu	hiu	jiu	kiu	khiu	liu		niu		piu		siu	tiu	thiu	tsiu	tshiu	iu
iunn	iunn			hiunn		kiunn	khiunn							siunn	tiunn		tsiunn	tshiunn	iunn
iunnh	iunnh			hiunnh															iunnh
m	m			hm															m
mh				hmh															mh
ng	ng			hng		kng	khng		mng	nng		png		sng	tng	thng	tsng	tshng	ng
ngh				hngh									phngh	sngh				tshngh	ngh
o	o	bo	go	ho		ko	kho	lo				po	pho	so	to	tho	tso	tsho	o
oh	oh			hoh		koh		loh				poh	phoh	soh	toh	thoh	tsoh	tshoh	oh
ok	ok	bok	gok	hok		kok	khok	lok				pok	phok	sok	tok	thok	tsok	tshok	ok
om	om													som	tom				om
ong	ong	bong	gong	hong		kong	khong	long				pong	phong	song	tong	thong	tsong	tshong	ong
onn	onn			honn		konn													onn
onnh	onnh			honnh															onnh
oo	oo	boo	goo	hoo		koo	khoo	loo	moo	noo	ngoo	poo	phoo	soo	too	thoo	tsoo	tshoo	oo
ooh									mooh										ooh
u	u	bu	gu	hu	ju	ku	khu	lu				pu	phu	su	tu	thu	tsu	tshu	u
ua	ua	bua	gua	hua		kua	khua	lua	mua	nua		pua	phua	sua	tua	thua	tsua	tshua	ua
uah	uah	buah		huah	juah	kuah	khuah	luah				puah	phuah	suah		thuah	tsuah	tshuah	uah
uai	uai			huai		kuai	khuai							suai					uai
uainn	uainn			huainn		kuainn								suainn			tsuainn		uainn
uan	uan	buan	guan	huan		kuan	khuan	luan				puan	phuan	suan	tuan	thuan	tsuan	tshuan	uan
uang	uang																	tshuang	uang
uann	uann			huann		kuann	khuann					puann	phuann	suann	tuann	thuann		tshuann	uann
uat	uat	buat	guat	huat		kuat	khuat	luat				puat	phuat	suat	tuat	thuat	tsuat		uat
ue	ue	bue	gue	hue	jue	kue	khue	lue				pue	phue	sue	tue		tsue	tshue	ue
ueh	ueh	bueh	gueh	hueh		kueh	khueh					pueh	phueh	sueh					ueh
uh	uh						khuh					puh	phuh		tuh	thuh	tsuh	tshuh	uh
ui	ui	bui	gui	hui		kui	khui	lui	mui			pui	phui	sui	tui	thui	tsui	tshui	ui
un	un	bun	gun	hun	jun	kun	khun	lun				pun	phun	sun	tun	thun	tsun	tshun	un
ut	ut	but		hut		kut	khut	lut				put	phut	sut	tut	thut	tsut	tshut	ut
	Ø	b	g	h	j	k	kh	l	m	n	ng	p	ph	s	t	th	ts	tsh	

== Computing ==
The IETF language tags register nan-Latn-tailo for Tâi-lô text.

=== Unicode codepoints ===
The following are tone characters and their respective Unicode codepoints used in Tâi-lô. The tones used by Tâi-lô should use Combining Diacritical Marks instead of Spacing Modifier Letters used by bopomofo. As Tâi-lô is not encoded in Big5, the prevalent encoding used in Traditional Chinese, some Taiwanese Romanization System letters are not directly encoded in Unicode, instead should be typed using combining diacritical marks officially.

Tâi-lô tone characters^{[1]}
Base letter/Tone 1		Tone 2	Tone 3	Tone 4	Tone 5	Tone 6	Tone 7	Tone 8	Tone 9
Combining mark		́ (U+0301)	̀ (U+0300)	h	̂ (U+0302)	̌ (U+030C)	̄ (U+0304)	̍h (U+030D)	̋ (U+030B)
Uppercase	A	Á (U+00C1)	À (U+00C0)	AH	Â (U+00C2)	Ǎ (U+01CD)	Ā (U+0100)	A̍H (U+0041 U+030D)	A̋ (U+0041 U+030B)
Uppercase	E	É (U+00C9)	È (U+00C8)	EH	Ê (U+00CA)	Ě (U+011A)	Ē (U+0112)	E̍H (U+0045 U+030D)	E̋ (U+0045 U+030B)
Uppercase	I	Í (U+00CD)	Ì (U+00CC)	IH	Î (U+00CE)	Ǐ (U+01CF)	Ī (U+012A)	I̍H (U+0049 U+030D)	I̋ (U+0049 U+030B)
Uppercase	O	Ó (U+00D3)	Ò (U+00D2)	OH	Ô (U+00D4)	Ǒ (U+01D1)	Ō (U+014C)	O̍H (U+004F U+030D)	Ő (U+0150)
Uppercase	U	Ú (U+00DA)	Ù (U+00D9)	UH	Û (U+00DB)	Ǔ (U+01D3)	Ū (U+016A)	U̍H (U+0055 U+030D)	Ű (U+0170)
Uppercase	M	Ḿ (U+1E3E)	M̀ (U+004D U+0300)	MH	M̂ (U+004D U+0302)	M̌ (U+004D U+030C)	M̄ (U+004D U+0304)	M̍H (U+004D U+030D)	M̋ (U+004D U+030B)
Uppercase	N	Ń (U+0143)	Ǹ (U+01F8)	NH	N̂ (U+004E U+0302)	Ň (U+0147)	N̄ (U+004E U+0304)	N̍H (U+004E U+030D)	N̋ (U+004E U+030B)
Lowercase	a	á (U+00E1)	à (U+00E0)	ah	â (U+00E2)	ǎ (U+01CE)	ā (U+0101)	a̍h (U+0061 U+030D)	a̋ (U+0061 U+030B)
Lowercase	e	é (U+00E9)	è (U+00E8)	eh	ê (U+00EA)	ě (U+011B)	ē (U+0113)	e̍h (U+0065 U+030D)	e̋ (U+0065 U+030B)
Lowercase	i	í (U+00ED)	ì (U+00EC)	ih	î (U+00EE)	ǐ (U+01D0)	ī (U+012B)	i̍h (U+0069 U+030D)	i̋ (U+0069 U+030B)
Lowercase	o	ó (U+00F3)	ò (U+00F2)	oh	ô (U+00F4)	ǒ (U+01D2)	ō (U+014D)	o̍h (U+006F U+030D)	ő (U+0151)
Lowercase	u	ú (U+00FA)	ù (U+00F9)	uh	û (U+00FB)	ǔ (U+01D4)	ū (U+016B)	u̍h (U+0075 U+030D)	ű (U+0171)
Lowercase	m	ḿ (U+1E3F)	m̀ (U+006D U+0300)	mh	m̂ (U+006D U+0302)	m̌ (U+006D U+030C)	m̄ (U+006D U+0304)	m̍h (U+006D U+030D)	m̋ (U+006D U+030B)
Lowercase	n	ń (U+0144)	ǹ (U+01F9)	nh	n̂ (U+006E U+0302)	ň (U+0148)	n̄ (U+006E U+0304)	n̍h (U+006E U+030D)	n̋ (U+006E U+030B)
Notes: 1. Yellow cells indicate that there are no single Unicode character for that letter; the character shown here uses Combining Diacritical Mark characters to display the letter.

Characters not directly encoded in Unicode requires premade glyphs in fonts in order for applications to correctly display the characters.

=== Font support ===
Fonts that currently support POJ includes:

- Charis SIL
- DejaVu
- Doulos SIL
- Linux Libertine
- Taigi Unicode
- Source Sans Pro
- I.Ming (8.00 onwards) from Ichiten Font Project
- Fonts made by justfont foundry
- Fonts modified and release in GitHub repository POJFonts : POJ Phiaute, Gochi Hand POJ, Nunito POJ, POJ Vibes, and POJ Garamond.
- Fonts modified and released by But Ko based on Source Han Sans: Genyog, Genseki, Gensen; based on Source Han Serif: Genyo, Genwan, Genryu.
