= Nimbus =

Nimbus, from the Latin for "dark cloud", is an outdated term for the type of cloud now classified as the nimbostratus cloud. Nimbus also may refer to:

== Arts and entertainment ==
- Halo (religious iconography) or nimbus, a ring of light surrounding a person in a work of art
- Nimbus (literary magazine), published in London (1951–58)
- Nimbus 2000, a flying broom from the Harry Potter series
- Nimbus, a spaceship captained by Zapp Brannigan in the animated series Futurama
- Nimbus III, a planet in the movie Star Trek V: The Final Frontier
- Nimbus, a character in the video game Tornado Outbreak
- Nimbus, a type of guided missile in the video game Ace Combat 6: Fires of Liberation
- Nimbus, a flying cloud from the Dragon Ball series
- Mr. Nimbus, Rick's arch-nemesis in the series Rick and Morty
- "Nimbus", a song featured on the 1992 single "Timebomb" and on the 1993 album Gorgeous by 808 State

== Business ==
- Nimbus Communications Limited, an Indian media and entertainment company and sports broadcaster
- Nimbus Data, a flash memory-based storage systems company in San Francisco, California
- Nimbus Film, Denmark's third largest film production company
- Nimbus Publishing, a Canadian company
- Nimbus Records, a British company specializing in classical music recordings
- Nimsoft, originally Nimbus Software, a software vendor established in Oslo, Norway, later acquired by CA Inc.
- Nimbus Rooftop Bar, a bar in Bendigo, Australia
- Project Nimbus (Hebrew: פרויקט נימבוס) project by Google and Amazon providing the Israeli government including military with cloud infrastructure and AI services

== Places ==
- Nimbus Hills, Ellsworth Mountains, Antarctica
- Nimbus Dam, on the American River near Folsom, California

== Science and computing ==
- Halo (optical phenomenon), also known as nimbus, produced by ice crystals in the sky
- Nimbus program, satellites for meteorological research
- RM Nimbus, a 1980s British microcomputer
- Nimbus (cipher), an encryption algorithm
- Nimbus (cloud computing), an open-source software toolkit for running an infrastructure as a service
- Nimbus Mono, a monospaced typeface created by URW++
- Nimbus Note, a cross-platform note-taking app created by Nimbus Web Inc
- Nimbus Sans, a sans-serif typeface created by URW++
- Nimbus Roman, a serif typeface created by URW++
- NB.1.8.1, a SARS-CoV-2 Omicron variant

== Transportation ==
- Nimbus 42, a Swedish sailboat design
- Nimbus (motorcycle), a Danish produced motorcycle manufactured in 1919–1928 and 1934–1960
- Mitsubishi Nimbus, one name for the Mitsubishi Chariot automobile
- Schempp-Hirth HS-3 Nimbus, a family of high-performance, open-class sailplanes
- Mitchell Nimbus, a series of American gliders
- Short Nimbus, a British two-seat glider trainer designed in 1947
- Akaflieg Braunschweig SB-7 Nimbus, a German glider of the 1960s
- Bristol Siddeley Nimbus, later Rolls-Royce Nimbus, a British turboshaft engine used in helicopters
- ADC Nimbus, a British inline aero engine that first ran in 1926
- Albion Nimbus, an ultra-lightweight midibus or coach chassis
- Caetano Nimbus, a bus body produced in England between 1999 and 2007
- Wright Nimbus, a minibus body

== Other uses ==
- Nimbus (horse), multiple horses with this name
- Nimbus (technical festival), an Indian student technical festival
- Nimbus (beetle), a genus of beetles in the family Aphodiidae
