= Beamer (LaTeX) =

LaTeX document class for presentations

LaTeX Beamer class
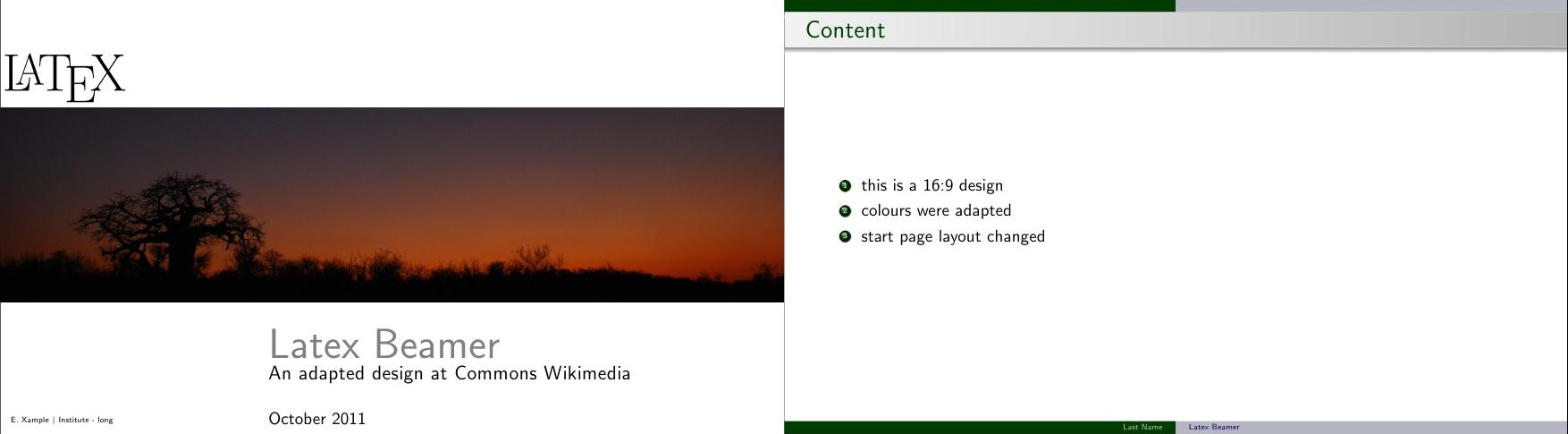
- LaTeX Beamer presentation screenshot
- Developers: Till Tantau, Joseph Wright, Vedran Miletić
- Release: March 2003; 23 years ago
- Stable release: 3.78 / August 20, 2026; 34 days ago
- Written in: LaTeX, TeX
- Operating system: Unix-like, Windows
- Platform: TeX Live, MiKTeX
- Available in: English, German, Croatian, Serbian
- Type: Presentation software
- License: LaTeX Project Public License, GNU General Public License
- Website: ctan.org/pkg/beamer
- Repository: github.com/josephwright/beamer

Beamer is a LaTeX document class for creating presentation slides, with a wide range of templates and a set of features for making slideshow effects.

It supports pdfLaTeX, LaTeX + dvips, LuaLaTeX and XeLaTeX. The name is taken from the German word "Beamer" as a pseudo-anglicism for "video projector".

== Method ==
The Beamer class is not the first LaTeX class for creating presentations, and like many of its predecessors (such as slides, seminar, prosper, powerdot), it has special syntax for defining "slides" (known in Beamer as "frames").

Slides can be built up on-screen in stages as if by revealing text that was previously hidden or covered. This is handled with PDF output by creating successive pages that preserve the layout but add new elements, so that advancing to the next page in the PDF file appears to add something to the displayed page, when in fact it has merely redrawn the page.

The list of features supported by Beamer is quite long. The most important features, according to the user guide are:

- Beamer can be used with pdfLaTeX, LaTeX+dvips, LuaLaTeX and XeLaTeX. LaTeX+dvipdfm isn't supported.
- The standard commands of LaTeX still work. A \tableofcontents will still create a table of contents, \section is still used to create structure, and itemize still creates a list.
- Overlays and dynamic effects can be easily created.
- The appearance of presentations can be modified using themes.
- The layout, the colors, and the fonts used in a presentation can easily be changed globally, while preserving control over the most minute detail.
- A special style file allows for the use of the LaTeX source of a presentation directly in other LaTeX classes such as article or book. This makes it easy to create presentations out of lecture notes or lecture notes out of presentations.
- The final output is typically a PDF file, making it highly portable and worry-free, in the sense that a given presentation will always look the same no matter the machine it is opened on.

Source code for Beamer presentations, like any other LaTeX file, can be created using any text editor, but there is specific support for Beamer syntax in AUCTeX and LyX.

Beamer supports syntax of other LaTeX presentation packages, including Prosper, Powerdot and Foils, by using compatibility packages.

== Output options ==
Beamer provides the ability to make "handouts", which is a version of the output suitable for printing without the dynamic features, so that the printed version of a slide shows the final version that will appear during the presentation. For actually putting more than one frame on the paper, the pgfpages package is to be used.

An "article" version is also available, rendered on standard sized paper (like A4 or letter), with frame titles used as paragraph titles, no special slide layout/colors, keeping the sectioning. This version is suitable for lecture notes or for having a single source file for an article and the slides for the talk about this article.

== Dependencies ==
Beamer depends on the PGF and xcolor packages for some of its features.

== See also ==
- Powerdot – a LaTeX class for making professional-looking presentation slides
