= Courier (typeface) =

Monospaced slab serif typeface

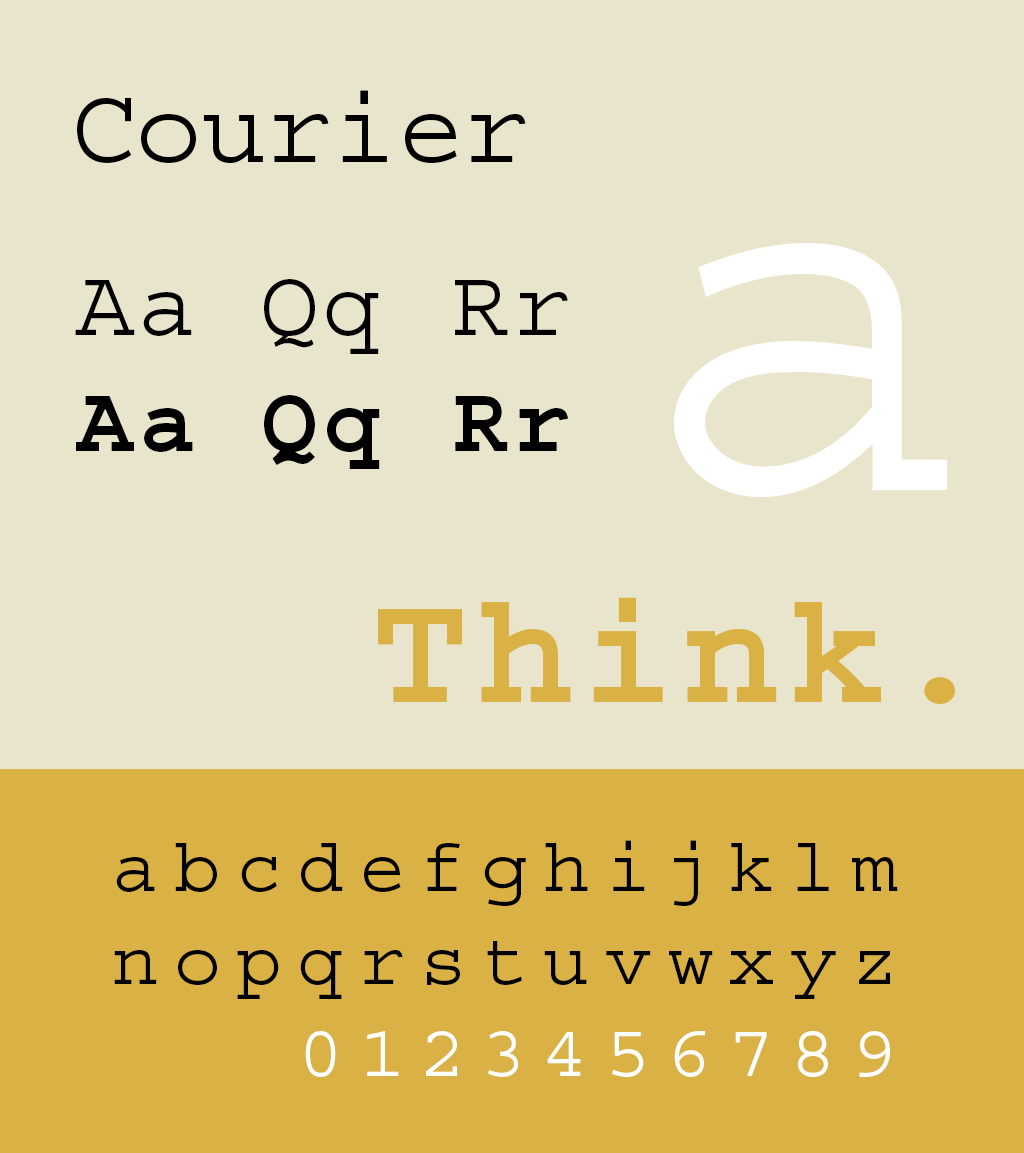
- Category: Monospaced
- Classification: Slab serif
- Designer: Howard "Bud" Kettler
- Commissioned by: IBM
- Date created: 1955
- Re-issuing foundries: Adobe; Bitstream; URW; Monotype
- Metrically compatible with: Cousine

Courier is a monospaced slab serif typeface designed in the mid-1950s by Howard "Bud" Kettler for IBM. The Courier name and design concept are in the public domain. Courier has been adapted for use as a computer font, and versions of it are installed on most desktop computers.

== History ==
IBM did not trademark the name Courier, so the name and its design (Note: Typeface designs are not subject to copyright in US law. In most other jurisdictions, the normal laws affecting intellectual property in design apply equally to typefaces.) are now public domain. (Note: "IBM neglected to trademark the typeface names like Courier and Prestige, so once the patents had lapsed, the names gradually fell into the public domain without IBM doing anything about it (at the time, and for a dozen years or so, IBM was distracted by a major U.S. anti-trust suit). Most students of the type protection field believe that those names are probably unprotectable by now, though IBM could still presumably make a try for it if sufficiently motivated." — Charles Bigelow, Stanford University.) According to some sources, a later version for IBM's Selectric typewriters was developed with input from Adrian Frutiger, although Paul Shaw writes that this is a confusion with Frutiger's adaptation of his Univers typeface for the Selectric system. Sources differ on whether the design was published in 1955 or 1956.

Kettler was once quoted about how the name was chosen. The font was nearly released with the name "Messenger". After giving it some thought, Kettler said, "A letter can be just an ordinary messenger, or it can be the courier, which radiates dignity, prestige, and stability."

== Usage ==
As a monospaced font, in the 1990s Courier found renewed use in the electronic world in situations where columns of characters must be consistently aligned, for instance, in computer programming. It has also become an industry standard for all screenplays to be written in 12-point Courier or a close variant. Twelve-point Courier New was also the U.S. State Department's standard typeface until January 2004, when it was replaced with 14-point Times New Roman. Reasons for the change included the desire for a more "modern" and "legible" font.

== Variants ==
=== Code variants ===
With the rise of digital computing, variants of the Courier typeface were developed with features helpful in coding: larger punctuation marks, stronger distinctions between similar characters (such as the numeral 0 vs. the upper-case O and the numeral 1 vs. the lower-case L), sans-serif variants, and other features to provide increased legibility when viewed on screens. Today, many Courier typefaces include a code version within the type family. Courier New Baltic, Courier New CE, Courier New Cyr, Courier New Greek, Courier New Tur are aliases created in the FontSubstitutes section of WIN.INI. These entries all point to the master font. When an alias font is specified, the font's character map contains a different character set from the master font and the other alias fonts.

=== IBM Courier ===
IBM made Courier freely available in PostScript Type 1 format. Known as IBM Courier or simply Courier, it is available under the IBM/MIT X Consortium Courier Typefont agreement. Among other IBM-specific characters it contains optionally a dotted zero (which seems to have originated as an option on IBM 3270 display controllers) and a slashed zero.

=== Courier 10 Pitch BT and Courier Code ===
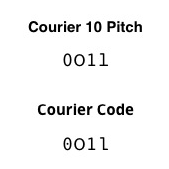
Comparison of the typefaces Courier 10 Pitch and Courier Code. From left to right the characters are: zero, capital O, one, lowercase L.

The Courier 10 Pitch BT typeface was released as a font by Bitstream. Courier 10 BT is heavier than Courier New and more closely approximates the look of the original Courier type on paper. The freely available version, often seen as a system font on electronic devices, includes the 255 characters of the ANSI character set in Type 1 format. Courier 10 BT has been donated to the X Consortium by Bitstream (along with Bitstream Charter) and is the default Courier font on most Linux distributions. Expanded Pan-European (W1G) character sets are made available for license by Bitstream.

Courier Code is a variant of Courier 10 Pitch BT for use in programming. The zero is dotted to better distinguish it from the capital O and the lowercase L has been altered to better distinguish it from the number one. The leading has been increased slightly as well.

=== Courier New ===
Courier New appears as a system font on many electronic devices. This Courier variant was produced for electronic use by Monotype. Its thin appearance when printed on paper owes to its being "digitized directly from the golf ball of the IBM Selectric" without accounting for the visual weight normally added by the typewriter's ink ribbon. ClearType rendering technology includes a hack to make the font appear more legible on screens, though printouts retain the thin look. The font family includes Courier New, Courier New Bold, Courier New Italic, and Courier New Bold Italic.

Courier New was introduced as a system font with Windows 3.1, which also included raster Courier fonts.

=== Courier Prime ===
Courier Prime
- Sample

This Courier typeface, developed by Alan Dague-Greene with funding from John August and Quote-Unquote Apps, includes a true Italic style. Courier Prime matches the metrics of Courier Final Draft, with some design changes and improvements aimed at greater legibility and beauty. The typeface was released in January 2013 under the SIL Open Font License. In 2016 the family was extended with Sans Serif and Code versions. By mid-2018 the family included Semi-Bold and Medium versions (designed by M. Babek Aliassa) and a Cyrillic alphabet version (designed by Ivan Gladkikh). All fonts in the family are downloadable for free and can be used in any application.

=== Courier Screenplay ===
A typeface developed for Fade In Professional Screenwriting Software, Courier Screenplay is designed to offer the legibility of Courier 10 BT with the line counts favoured by screenwriters. The font is downloadable for free independent of the software and can be used in any application. The typeface provides the ANSI 255 character map used in Western European languages.

=== Courier Final Draft ===
Courier Final Draft is a version of Courier 10 BT developed for the Final Draft screenwriting program. The installed font can be used in any application. Default settings in the program yield 55 lines per page.

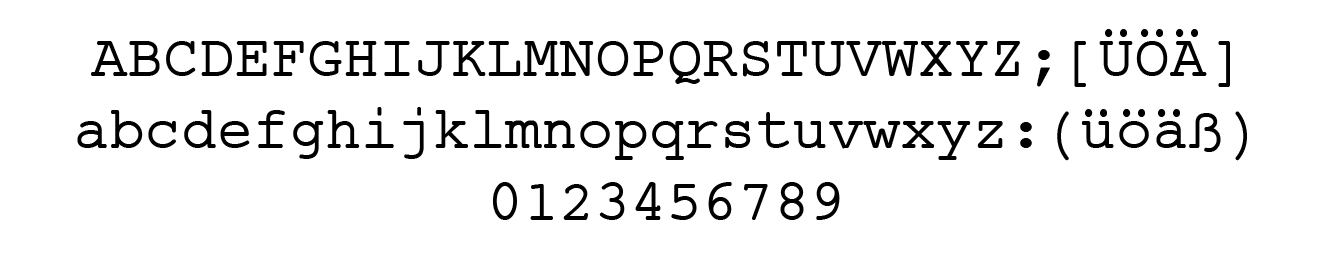
Specimen of Courier Final Draft

=== Dark Courier ===
Dark Courier is a normal-weight typeface rather than a semi-bold or bold as its name may imply. Dark Courier, developed as a TrueType font by HP, was one of the first fonts developed as a Courier New alternative for those who found that typeface too thin.

=== Nimbus Mono L ===
URW++ produced a version of Courier called Nimbus Mono L in 1984, and eventually released under the GPL and AFPL (as Type 1 font for Ghostscript) in 1996. It is one of the Ghostscript fonts, free alternatives to 35 core PostScript fonts, which include Courier. It is available in major free and open source operating systems.

- Tex Gyre Cursor, developed by GUST ("the Polish TeX Users Group"), is based on the URW Nimbus Mono L typeface.
- FreeMono, a free font descending from URW++ Nimbus Mono L, which, in turn, descends from Courier. It is one of free fonts developed in GNU FreeFont project, first published in 2002. It is used in some free software as a Courier replacement or for Courier font substitution.

=== Fonts-TLWG ===
Thai Linux Working Group publish several typefaces as free and open-source software monospace. 4 of those typefaces contain Courier glyphs: TlwgMono, Tlwg Typewriter, Tlwg Typist and Tlwg Typo.

=== Courier Recast ===
Designed by Reiko Hirai, Emanuela Conidi, and Jonny Pinhorn for Dalton Maag, Courier Recast is available in nine weights with upright and italic styles, as well as in variable font format with axes for weight.

== Alternatives and derivatives ==
Many monospaced typefaces used as alternatives to Courier in coding are sans-serif fonts for on-screen legibility.

- Liberation Mono is a sans-serif font metrically equivalent to Courier New, developed by Ascender Corp. and published by Red Hat in 2007 under the GPL license with some exceptions. It is used in some Linux distributions as default font replacement for Courier New.
- Cousine Croscore font, also by Ascender and basically the same as Liberation Mono 2.0

== Applications ==
=== In Latin 1 text ===
Courier is commonly used in ASCII art because it is a monospaced font and is available almost universally. "Solid-style" ASCII art uses the darkness/lightness of each character to portray an object, which can be quantified in pixels (here in 12-point size):

a	b	c	d	e	f	g	h	i	j	k	l	m	n	o	p	q	r	s	t	u	v	w	x	y	z
21	25	18	25	24	19	28	24	14	15	25	16	30	21	20	27	27	18	21	17	19	17	25	20	21	21

A	B	C	D	E	F	G	H	I	J	K	L	M	N	O	P	Q	R	S	T	U	V	W	X	Y	Z
25	29	21	26	29	25	27	31	18	19	28	20	36	24	20	25	28	30	28	24	27	22	30	26	23	24

`	1	2	3	4	5	6	7	8	9	0	-	=	~	!	@	#	$	%	^	&	*	(	)	_	+
2	16	19	20	23	23	23	16	26	23	24	6	12	9	9	36	30	26	20	7	24	21	13	13	9	13

[	]	\	;	'	,	.	/	{	}	|	:	"	<	>	?
17	17	8	11	4	7	4	8	16	16	13	8	8	9	9	13

=== In computer programming ===
Courier, as a common monospaced font, is often used to signify source code.

== See also ==
- American Typewriter – Slab serif typeface
- IBM Plex – Open source typeface family
- Monospaced font – Font with glyphs of fixed-size widths
- Proportional font – Font with glyphs of varying widths
- Sentence spacing – Horizontal space between sentences in typeset text
- TrueType core fonts for the Web – Fonts supplied by Microsoft for canonical web use
- Typewriter § Elite - typewriter "typeface"
- Typewriter § Pica - typewriter "typeface"
