= ITL =

ITL can refer to:

- International Territorial Level, geographic classification in the United Kingdom.
- Imaging Technology Laboratory, part of the University of Arizona's Steward Observatory
- In the Labyrinth, a role-playing system built on The Fantasy Trip
- Inferential theory of learning
- Information Technology Limited, a British computer company of the 1980s (formerly CTL)
- Information Technology Laboratory, a United States Army Corps of Engineers Laboratory
- Information Technology Laboratory, a United States National Institute for Standards and Technology (NIST) laboratory since 2010
- Integrate-Transfer-Launch Complex, a rocket launch site at Cape Canaveral Space Force Station
- Institute of Technology Law, National Chiao Tung University a law school in Taiwan
- Interval Temporal Logic, a temporal logic
- Islamic Tools and Libraries, a subproject of Arabeyes software which provides Hijri dates, Muslim prayer times and Qibla
- Italian lira, the former currency of Italy that had ISO 4217 code ITL
- Iterative test-last, opposite of iterative test-first software development process
- Estonian Association of Information Technology and Telecommunications, abbreviated in Estonian as ITL
- ITL, Russian-language abbreviation for "correctional labor camp", used in the names of GULAG labor camps
