= Powerdot =

LaTeX class for making professional-looking presentation slides

- Developers: Hendri Adriaens, Christopher Ellison
- Initial release: 2005; 21 years ago
- Stable release: v1.7 / May 19, 2021; 4 years ago
- Platform: LaTeX
- Type: Presentation software
- License: LaTeX Project Public License
- Website: powerdot

Powerdot is a LaTeX class for making professional-looking presentation slides. It can be considered an alternative to the class Beamer. This class is based on the prosper class and HA-prosper package and was created with the intention to replace prosper and HA-prosper.
