= Source Serif =

Serif font family

- Category: Serif
- Classification: Transitional serif, Slab serif
- Designer: Frank Grießhammer
- Foundry: Adobe Systems
- Date created: 2014
- License: SIL Open Font License
- Latest release version: 4.004
- Latest release date: January 25, 2021; 5 years ago

Source Serif (known as Source Serif Pro before 2021) is a serif typeface created by Frank Grießhammer for Adobe Systems. It is the third open-source font family from Adobe, distributed under the SIL Open Font License.

The typeface is inspired by the forms of Pierre Simon Fournier and is a complementary design to the Source Sans family. It is available in six weights in upright styles and italics, and five optical sizes. It is also available as a variable font with continuous weights from 200 to 900.

The first version, named "Source Serif Pro", was released in 2014. Version 2.0 was released in 2017 and introduced support for more Latin characters, Cyrillic, and Greek. In 2018, Latin italics were added in version "2.007R-ro/1.007R-it". In 2019, Greek and Cyrillic italic were added in version "3.000R". In 2021, a new release added optical sizes; the name "Pro" was dropped at this point.

== See also ==
- Adobe Originals

=== Adobe's open-source family ===
- Source Sans, the first member of Adobe's open-source family.
- Source Code Pro, the second member of Adobe's open-source family.
- Source Han Sans, the fourth member of Adobe's open-source family and the first to include CJK characters.
- Source Han Serif, the last member of Adobe's open-source family and includes CJK characters.
