= Nimbus Sans =

Neo-grotesque sans-serif typeface

- Category: Sans-serif
- Classification: Neo-grotesque
- Designer: URW Studio
- Foundry: URW++
- Date released: 1999
- Design based on: Helvetica
- Variations: URW Heisei Gothic

Nimbus Sans is a sans-serif typeface created by URW++, based on Helvetica.

== Nimbus Sans ==
This version uses URW++ font source and historically has three optical sizes, labelled T (Text), D (Display), and P (Poster), although the P version is generally no longer available. Some fonts in the family support Western Europe, East Europe, Turkish, Baltic, and Romanian languages.

As the labels suggest, Nimbus Sans D and P are created for larger texts, thus have lighter font weights and tighter spacing. The two optical sizes have similar designs, with Nimbus Sans P being even tighter. Nimbus Sans P includes alternate designs for currency symbols.

Florian Hardwig has described the display-oriented styles of Nimbus Sans P, with tight spacing, as more reminiscent of Helvetica as used in the 1970s from cold type than the early official Helvetica digitisations.

Weight	condensed	medium	extended
Black	roman	roman, italic	roman
Bold	roman	roman, italic	roman
Regular	roman	roman, italic	roman
Light	-	roman, italic	roman
(D) fonts
Weight	condensed	medium	extended
Black	roman, italic	roman, italic	roman, outline
Bold	roman, italic	roman, italic, outline	roman
Regular	roman, italic	roman, italic	roman
Light	roman, italic	roman, italic	roman
Ultra Light	-	roman	-
(P) fonts
Weight	condensed	medium	extended
Black	roman, italic	roman, italic	-
Bold	roman, italic	roman, italic	-
Regular	roman, italic	roman, italic	-
Light	roman, italic	roman, italic	-
Ultra Light	-	roman	-

=== Nimbus Sans Diagonal ===
It is a version with more right lean than Nimbus Sans italic fonts. The family currently only includes 1 font, in Black weight in medium width.

=== Nimbus Sans Mono ===
It is a monospaced variant of Nimbus Sans. The family currently only includes 1 font, in Regular weight in medium width.

=== Language extension ===
Nimbus Sans has multiple language-specific versions, supporting Arabic and Hebrew, Chinese, Japanese, Thai, and Devanagari scripts.

There is also Nimbus Sans Global, which covers all the above languages in addition to Korean and Vietnamese.

== Nimbus Sans L ==
Created in 1987, Nimbus Sans L is a version of Nimbus Sans using Adobe font sources. The typeface was shipped with Apple's LaserWriter II, hence the "L" label. The family includes 17 fonts in 5 weights and 2 widths, with Nimbus Sans L Extra Black only available in condensed roman format.

A subset of Nimbus Sans L, which includes regular and bold weight fonts in all widths and styles, were made open source. The font family was released under the GPL and AFPL in Type 1 format in 1996 and LPPL in 2009, making it one of several freely licensed fonts offered by URW++. Nimbus Sans L is part of the Ghostscript free font collection, a set of free alternatives to the 35 basic PostScript fonts (which include Helvetica). The Ghostscript version was updated as recently as in 2020.

Nimbus Sans L has metrics similar to Helvetica and Arial, and is a standard typeface in many Linux distributions and open-source applications. For example, it was used as default font in OpenOffice.org Calc and Impress, but its successor LibreOffice used Liberation Sans as the default sans-serif font. However, its popularity also leads to confusion, since it is often simply called Nimbus Sans in the open-source sphere, without the "L" label.

Most versions of Nimbus Sans L support Greek and Cyrillic characters.

=== TeX Gyre Heros ===
A derivative of Nimbus Sans L created for TeX environments and also in the OpenType format. It includes limited support for Greek characters with a provisional design.

TeX Gyre Heros introduces a series of technical and typographic improvements intended for professional digital typesetting. Compared to Nimbus Sans L, TeX Gyre Heros features a greatly expanded character set, providing broad Unicode coverage suitable for multilingual documents. Its outlines were revised to improve consistency.

TeX Gyre Heros incorporates explicit kerning tables, which are largely absent in Nimbus Sans L, resulting in improved letter spacing and more reliable typographic quality. Metrics were refined to better align with Adobe Helvetica, increasing layout compatibility in automated and TeX-based workflows. The family was also normalized across weights and styles, with coordinated metrics, harmonized italics, and more consistent stroke progression between regular and bold cuts.

As a result, TeX Gyre Heros functions as a more reliable practical substitute for proprietary sans-serif fonts such as Helvetica and Arial than Nimbus Sans L. Although it is not a strict metric clone and does not replicate proprietary outline refinements, it represents a clear qualitative upgrade over Nimbus Sans L in terms of coverage, spacing, consistency, and usability in modern typesetting systems.

=== FreeSans ===
As part of the GNU FreeFont superfamilies, FreeSans extends Nimbus Sans L to cover a wide range of Unicode characters.

== Nimbus Sans Novus ==
Nimbus Sans Novus is a variant published by URW++ using Linotype's Stempel Studio source, based on Neue Helvetica, but without the extended width. Some digital releases have support for Greek and Cyrillic characters, some do not.

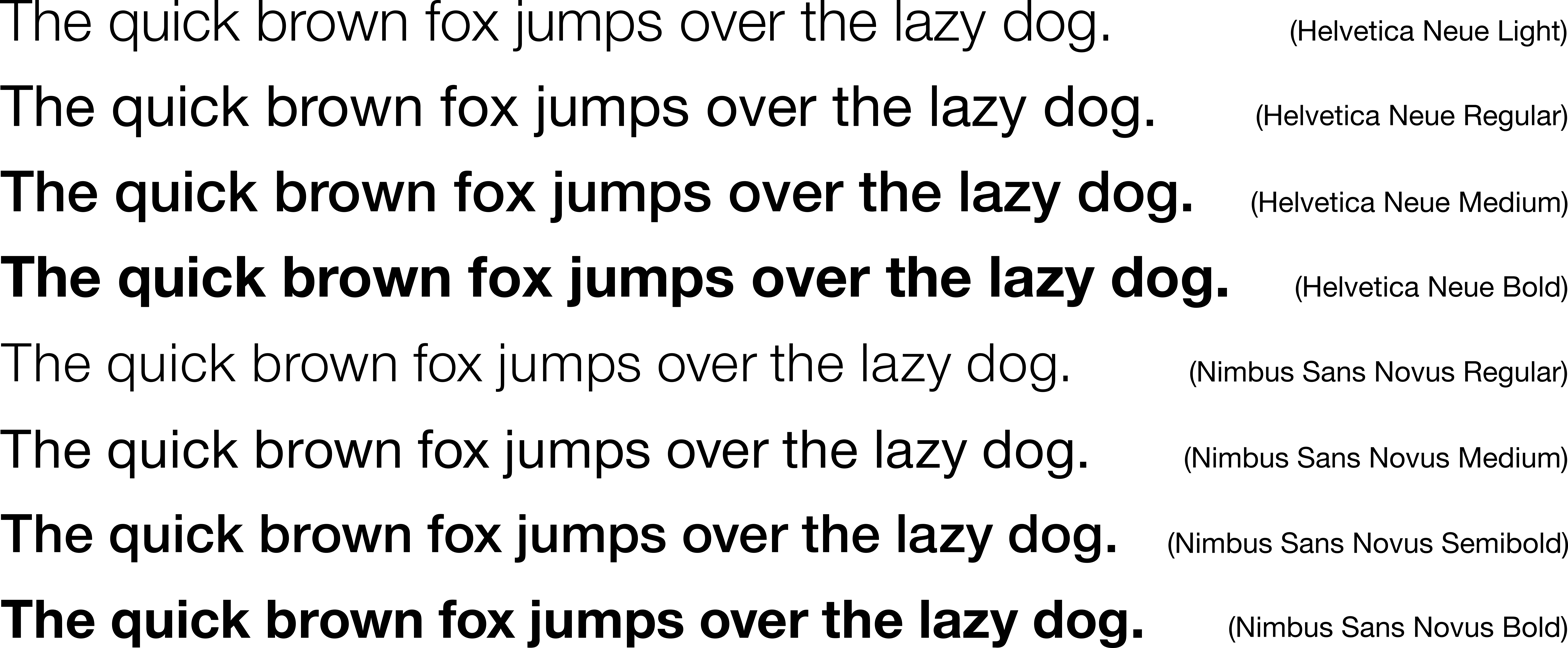
Comparisons between Neue Helvetica and Nimbus Sans Novus at the same font size.

While the design of the characters is based on Neue Helvetica, the two typefaces differ metrically: Nimbus Sans Novus has smaller x-height and is narrower at the same font size (but not at the same x-height).

The weight systems of the two typefaces also drastically differ. For instance, the Regular weight of Nimbus Sans Novus resembles the Light weight of Neue Helvetica, while the Medium weight of Nimbus Sans Novus resembles the Regular Neue Helvetica design. Nimbus Sans Novus has a Semibold weight, but Neue Helvetica does not.

The font names ending with (D) have tighter letter spacing.

Weight	condensed	medium
Ultra	roman, italic	-
Black	roman, italic	roman, italic
Heavy	roman, italic	roman, italic
Bold	roman, italic	roman, italic, outline
Semi Bold	roman, italic	roman, italic
Medium	roman, italic	roman, italic
Regular	roman, italic	roman, italic
Light	roman, italic	roman, italic
Ultra Light	roman, italic	roman, italic
(D) fonts
Weight	condensed	medium
Ultra	roman	-
Black	roman	roman, outline
Heavy	roman	roman
Bold	roman	roman
Semi Bold	roman	roman
Medium	roman	roman
Regular	roman	roman
Light	roman	roman
Ultra Light	roman	roman

== See also ==
- Nimbus Roman No9 L
- Nimbus Mono L
- Free software Unicode typefaces
