= Thai Linux Working Group =

- Abbreviation: TLWG
- Formation: 1998
- Website: Official website

Thai Linux Working Group (TLWG; Thai: ไทยลินุกซ์เวิร์กกิงกรุ๊ป) is a group of volunteers working on free and open-source software to support Thai language. The organization was founded in September 1998 with NECTEC's support.

In 1999, TLWG created MATEL (Mandrake and Thai Extension Linux). This Linux distribution eventually got renamed to LinuxTLE.

In 2016, source code created by TLWG has been moved to GitHub

== Projects ==
TLWG has created and continues to back several projects such as LinuxTLE, LibThai, SWATH, Fonts-TLWG. They also tweaked LaTeX to support Thai language.
