= Ubuntu Titling =

Geometric sans-serif typeface

Ubuntu-Title
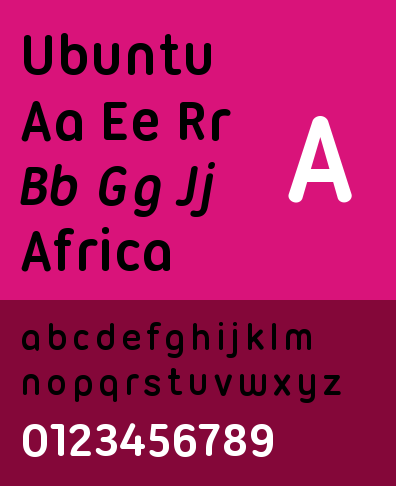
- Category: Sans-serif
- Classification: Geometric
- Designer: Andy Fitzsimon
- License: GNU Lesser General Public License

Ubuntu Titling or Ubuntu-Title is a rounded geometric sans-serif font. It was created by Andy Fitzsimon for use with the Ubuntu operating system and its derivatives. It is distributed under the GNU Lesser General Public License. Prior to the 10.04 release, the typeface was notably used in branding for the Ubuntu operating system and its related projects. Fitzsimon's design was created without any upper-case letters. A later release by Christian Robertson (who later created Roboto) added capitals and was released by Robertson at the "release candidate" stage. This was called Ubuntu Titling.

Ubuntu Titling was ultimately replaced for branding use with a variant from the Ubuntu Font Family.
