= Pstoedit =

Computer program that converts PostScript and PDF files to other vector formats

pstoedit
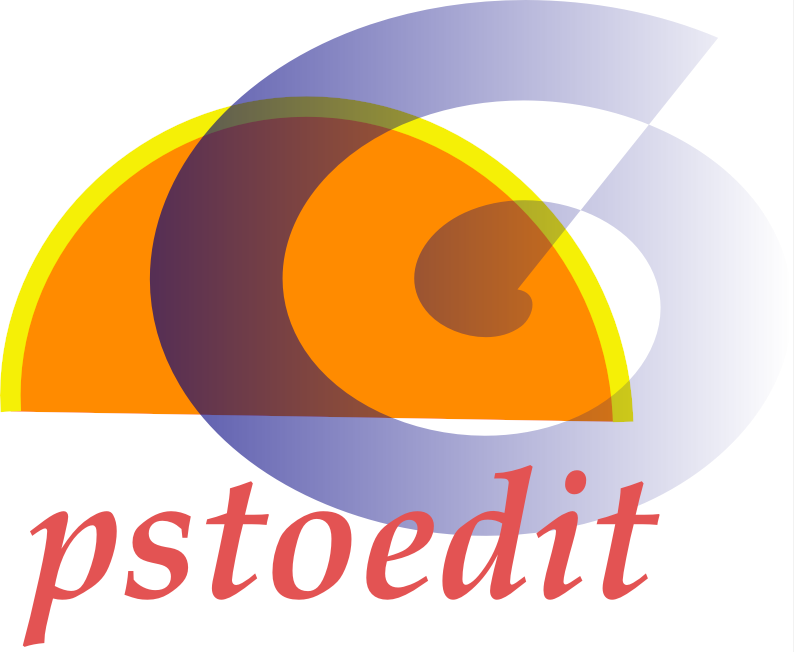
- Developer(s): Wolfgang Glunz
- Stable release: 4.01 / 28 March 2024; 13 months ago
- Written in: C++
- Type: Utility software
- License: GNU General Public License
- Website: pstoedit.net

pstoedit is a free computer program that converts PostScript and PDF files to other vector formats. It supports many output formats, including WMF/EMF, PDF, DXF, CGM, and HTML, and by means of free/shareware plugins SVG, MIF and RTF. The author and maintainer is Wolfgang Glunz.

pstoedit uses ghostscript to perform the first part of the conversion process. Ghostscript converts the PostScript (or PDF) file to a more basic PostScript format, translating complex functions to basic functions, such as line draw commands. The second part of the conversion process consists of translating these basic functions into basic functions of the output format.

pstoedit is multi platform. For MS Windows, a setup program is available for both 32bit and 64bit, which does the complete job (including for instance making the connection with ghostscript and MS Office). Three interfaces can be installed: the command line interface, an interface by means of gsview and an import filter for MS Office. However, to make actual use of this MS Office interface a $50 registration is required (this registration also adds functionality to the other two interfaces).

Licensed under the GNU General Public License, pstoedit is free software.

== See also ==
- List of PDF software
