= Nimbus Mono L =

Nimbus Mono
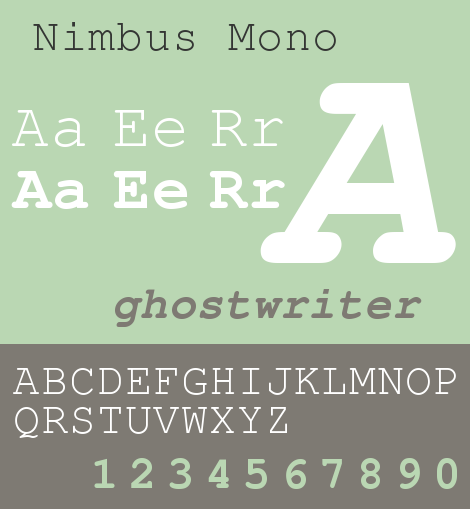
- Category: Monospace
- Designers: URW Studio (Adobe Studio); GPL version published also by Valek Fillipov
- Foundry: URW++
- Date released: 1984

Nimbus Mono is a monospaced typeface created by URW Studio in 1984, and eventually released under the GPL and AFPL (as Type 1 font for Ghostscript) in 1996 and LPPL in 2009. In 2017, the font, alongside other Core 35 fonts, has been additionally licensed under the terms of OFL. It features Normal, Bold, Italic, and Bold Italic weights, and is one of several freely licensed fonts offered by URW++. Although not exactly the same, Nimbus Mono has metrics and glyphs that are very similar to Courier and Courier New.

It is one of the Ghostscript fonts, free alternatives to 35 basic PostScript fonts (which include Courier). It is a standard typeface in many Linux distributions.

== See also ==
- Nimbus Sans L
- Nimbus Roman No9 L
- Free software Unicode typefaces
