= Ubuntu (typeface) =

Open-source sans-serif typeface family

Ubuntu Font Family
- Category: Sans-serif
- Classification: Humanist sans-serif
- Designers: Vincent Connare, others
- Commissioned by: Canonical
- Foundry: Dalton Maag
- Date created: 2010; 16 years ago
- License: Ubuntu Font
- Variations: Ubuntu Monospace, Ubuntu Condensed
- Website: github.com/canonical/Ubuntu-Sans-fonts

Ubuntu is an OpenType-based font family, designed to be a modern, humanist-style typeface by London-based type foundry Dalton Maag, with funding by Canonical Ltd. The font was under development for nearly nine months, with only a limited initial release through a beta program, until September 2010. It then became the new default font of the Ubuntu operating system in Ubuntu 10.10. Its designers include Vincent Connare, creator of the Comic Sans and Trebuchet MS fonts.

The Ubuntu font family is licensed under the Ubuntu Font Licence.

== History and features ==
The font was first introduced in October 2010 with the release of Ubuntu 10.10 in four versions: Regular, Italic, Bold, and Bold Italic in English. With the release of Ubuntu 11.04 in April 2011, additional fonts and expanded language coverage were introduced. The final development is intended to include a total of thirteen fonts, consisting of:

- Ubuntu in Regular, Italic, Bold and Bold Italic
- Ubuntu Monospace in Regular, Italic, Bold and Bold Italic
- Ubuntu Light in Regular and Italic
- Ubuntu Medium in Regular and Italic
- Ubuntu Condensed in Regular only

The monospace version, used in terminals, was initially planned to ship with Ubuntu 11.04. However, it was delayed and instead shipped with Ubuntu 11.10 as the default system monospace font.

The font is fully Unicode compliant and contains Latin A and B extended character sets, Greek polytonic, and Cyrillic extended. In addition, it has become the first native operating system font to include the Indian rupee sign. The font has been designed primarily for use on screen displays, and its spacing and kerning is optimized for body copy sizes.

Between 2022 and 2023, the typeface was updated to a slimmer design and enhanced with variable axes. The revised family, named Ubuntu Sans, was released alongside Ubuntu 24.04.

== Usage ==
The Ubuntu Font Family is the default font for the current and development releases of the Ubuntu operating system and is used for the Ubuntu project branding.

Ubuntu has been included in the Google Fonts directory, making it easily available for web typography, and as of 26 April 2011, it is included for use in Google Docs.

Ubuntu Mono is one of the fonts used in the 2014 video game Transistor.

Ubuntu Bold Italic is also used in the bitcoin logotype, alongside the bitcoin symbol.

Ubuntu Sans is the font used in the "GIF Maker" by the popular GIF sharing app Tenor. The font has become very popular in internet meme culture, being used commonly to caption GIFs and images.

== Ubuntu Font Licence ==
Ubuntu Font Licence
- Publisher: Canonical Ltd.
- Debian FSG compatible: No
- FSF approved: No
- OSI approved: No

The Ubuntu Font Licence is an "interim" license designed for the Ubuntu Font Family, which has used the license since version 0.68. The license is based on the SIL Open Font License.

The Ubuntu Font Licence allows the fonts to be "used, studied, modified and redistributed freely" given that the license terms are met. The license is copyleft and all derivative works must be distributed under the same license. Documents that use the fonts are not required to be licensed under the Ubuntu Font Licence.

Fedora and Debian have reviewed this license and converged on interpreting it as non-free due to incomplete or ambiguous use and modification permissions.

== See also ==
- FF Dax, a similar spurless sans-serif font
- Ubuntu Titling font
- Open-source Unicode typefaces
- GPL font exception
- SIL Open Font License
