= Arabeyes =

Online language learning platform

- Website type: Privately held company
- Available in: Arabic
- Industry: e-Learning, online education
- Website: www.arabeyes.org
- Launched: 2001; 25 years ago
- Current status: Online

Arabeyes (Arabic: عرب آيز) is a free and open-source project that is aimed at fully supporting the Arabic language in the Unix/Linux environment. It was established in early 2001 by a number of Arab Linux enthusiasts. They made the "world's first Arabic Linux live CD." The name is a play on the word "Arabise" (which, in this context, means to adapt software so that it is compatible with Arabic), and "eyes" a term for many people.

== Project ==
The project runs a portal for sub-projects such as Arabic free software Unicode fonts and text editor, the "ITL" (Islamic Tools and Libraries) which provide Hijri dates, Muslim prayer times and Qibla. In October 2003, they released Linux distribution named Arabbix, the "world's first Arabic Linux live CD". They have worked on an Arabised version of OpenOffice. They maintain a Linux distribution called Hilali Linux. It includes a translation project to provide an Arabic interface to KDE and GNOME windows managers, and a Linux documentation project. In 2003, the group released the first open source word list for use in English to Arabic translation and dictionary projects; on release it was included in "virtually all online multilingual translation sites".

Located online at arabeyes.org, this network calls itself as a "meta project that is aimed at fully supporting the Arabic language in the Unix/Linux environment." It is designed to be a central location to standardize the Arabization process. Arabeyes relies on voluntary contributions by computer professionals and enthusiasts scattered across the globe.

At the 2004 Casablanca GNU/Linux Days conference held in Morocco, Arabeyes was awarded the Best Free/Open Project. The award was presented by Richard Stallman, founder of GNU Project and Free Software Foundation.
