= Source Code Pro =

Monospaced sans-serif typeface

- Category: Sans-serif, Monospace
- Designer: Paul D. Hunt
- Foundry: Adobe Systems
- Date created: 2012
- License: SIL Open Font License
- Design based on: Source Sans

Source Code Pro is a monospaced sans serif typeface created by Paul D. Hunt for Adobe Systems. It is the second open-source font family from Adobe, distributed under the SIL Open Font License.

== Source Code Pro (2012) ==
Source Code Pro is a set of monospaced OpenType fonts designed to work well in coding environments. This family of fonts complements the Source Sans family and is available in seven weights: Extralight, Light, Regular, Medium, Semibold, Bold, Black.

Changes from Source Sans Pro include:

- Long x-height
- Dotted zero
- Redesigned i, j, and l
- Increased sizes of punctuation marks
- Optimized shapes of important characters like the greater- and less-than signs
- Adjusted heights of dashes and mathematical symbols improving alignment with each other

The font has been regularly upgraded since its first release. Italics styles were added in 2015, and variable formats were introduced in 2018.

== See also ==
=== Adobe's open-source family ===
- Source Sans, the first member of Adobe's open-source family.
- Source Serif, the third member of Adobe's open-source family.
- Source Han Sans, the fourth member of Adobe's open-source family and the first to include CJK characters.
- Source Han Serif, the last member of Adobe's open source family and includes CJK characters.
