= Glagolitic (Unicode block) =

- Range: U+2C00..U+2C5F (96 code points)
- Plane: BMP
- Scripts: Glagolitic
- Major alphabets: Old Slavonic
- Assigned: 96 code points
- Unused: 0 reserved code points

Unicode version history
- 4.1 (2005): 94 (+94)
- 14.0 (2021): 96 (+2)

Unicode documentation
- Code chart ∣ Web page

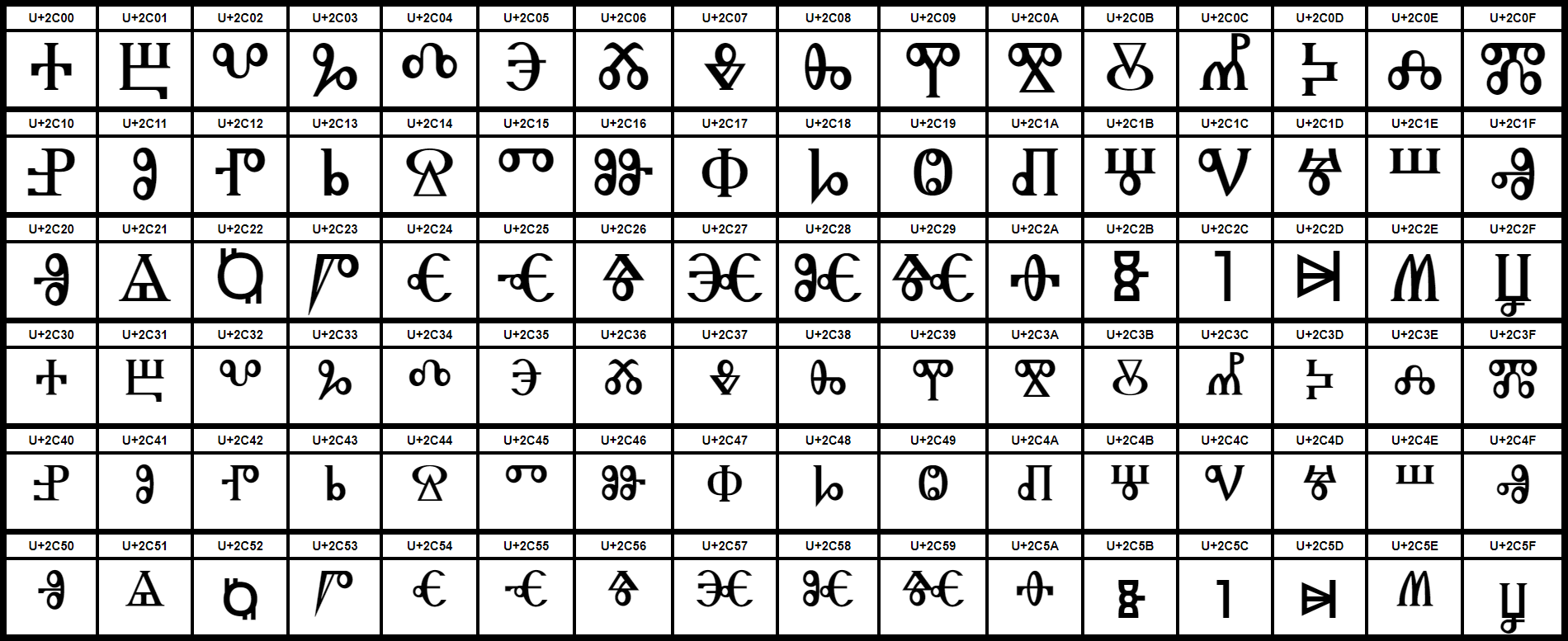
Graphical representation of the Glagolitic Unicode block

Glagolitic is a Unicode block containing the characters invented by Saint Cyril for translating scripture into Slavonic. Glagolitic script is the precursor of Cyrillic.

== Block ==
Glagolitic^{[1]} Official Unicode Consortium code chart (PDF)
	0	1	2	3	4	5	6	7	8	9	A	B	C	D	E	F
U+2C0x	Ⰰ	Ⰱ	Ⰲ	Ⰳ	Ⰴ	Ⰵ	Ⰶ	Ⰷ	Ⰸ	Ⰹ	Ⰺ	Ⰻ	Ⰼ	Ⰽ	Ⰾ	Ⰿ
U+2C1x	Ⱀ	Ⱁ	Ⱂ	Ⱃ	Ⱄ	Ⱅ	Ⱆ	Ⱇ	Ⱈ	Ⱉ	Ⱊ	Ⱋ	Ⱌ	Ⱍ	Ⱎ	Ⱏ
U+2C2x	Ⱐ	Ⱑ	Ⱒ	Ⱓ	Ⱔ	Ⱕ	Ⱖ	Ⱗ	Ⱘ	Ⱙ	Ⱚ	Ⱛ	Ⱜ	Ⱝ	Ⱞ	Ⱟ
U+2C3x	ⰰ	ⰱ	ⰲ	ⰳ	ⰴ	ⰵ	ⰶ	ⰷ	ⰸ	ⰹ	ⰺ	ⰻ	ⰼ	ⰽ	ⰾ	ⰿ
U+2C4x	ⱀ	ⱁ	ⱂ	ⱃ	ⱄ	ⱅ	ⱆ	ⱇ	ⱈ	ⱉ	ⱊ	ⱋ	ⱌ	ⱍ	ⱎ	ⱏ
U+2C5x	ⱐ	ⱑ	ⱒ	ⱓ	ⱔ	ⱕ	ⱖ	ⱗ	ⱘ	ⱙ	ⱚ	ⱛ	ⱜ	ⱝ	ⱞ	ⱟ
Notes: 1. As of Unicode version 16.0

== History ==
The following Unicode-related documents record the purpose and process of defining specific characters in the Glagolitic block:

Version	Final code points (Note: Proposed code points and characters names may differ from final code points and names)	Count	L2 ID	WG2 ID	Document
4.1	U+2C00..2C2E, 2C30..2C5E	94	L2/98-190		Glagolitic coded character set for bibliographic information interchange, 1996-12-15
4.1	U+2C00..2C2E, 2C30..2C5E	94	L2/98-023	N1659	Everson, Michael (1997-12-08), Proposal to encode Glagolitic in ISO/IEC 10646
4.1	U+2C00..2C2E, 2C30..2C5E	94	L2/98-070		Aliprand, Joan; Winkler, Arnold, "3.A.2. item d. Glagolitic", Minutes of the joint UTC and L2 meeting from the meeting in Cupertino, February 25-27, 1998
4.1	U+2C00..2C2E, 2C30..2C5E	94	L2/98-286	N1703	Umamaheswaran, V. S.; Ksar, Mike (1998-07-02), "8.9.3", Unconfirmed Meeting Minutes, WG 2 Meeting #34, Redmond, WA, USA; 1998-03-16--20
4.1	U+2C00..2C2E, 2C30..2C5E	94	L2/99-012	N1931	Everson, Michael (1998-11-24), Revised proposal for encoding the Glagolitic script in the UCS
4.1	U+2C00..2C2E, 2C30..2C5E	94	L2/99-054R		Aliprand, Joan (1999-06-21), "Glagolitic Script", Approved Minutes from the UTC/L2 meeting in Palo Alto, February 3-5, 1999
4.1	U+2C00..2C2E, 2C30..2C5E	94	L2/02-190		Wissink, Cathy (2002-04-22), Glagolitic Character Set
4.1	U+2C00..2C2E, 2C30..2C5E	94	L2/02-448	N2555	Everson, Michael; Cleminson, Ralph (2002-12-04), Revised proposal for encoding the Glagolitic script in the UCS
4.1	U+2C00..2C2E, 2C30..2C5E	94	L2/03-282R	N2610R	Everson, Michael; Cleminson, Ralph (2003-09-04), Final proposal for encoding the Glagolitic script in the UCS
4.1	U+2C00..2C2E, 2C30..2C5E	94	L2/04-052		Cleminson, Ralph (2004-01-16), Letter from Ralph Cleminson about Glagolitic encoding
4.1	U+2C00..2C2E, 2C30..2C5E	94	L2/04-051		Anderson, Deborah (2004-01-29), Comments on 2619R Final Glagolitic proposal
14.0	U+2C2F, 2C5F	2	L2/19-288R		Vukojević, Zoran (2019-09-09), Proposal to add a character used in printed Glagolitic works
14.0	U+2C2F, 2C5F	2	L2/19-343		Anderson, Deborah; Whistler, Ken; Pournader, Roozbeh; Moore, Lisa; Liang, Hai (2019-10-06), "1. Glagolitic", Recommendations to UTC #161 October 2019 on Script Proposals
14.0	U+2C2F, 2C5F	2	L2/19-323		Moore, Lisa (2019-10-01), "C.13", UTC #161 Minutes
