= Dvips =

dvips is a computer program that converts the Device Independent file format (DVI) output of TeX typography into a printable or otherwise presentable form. dvips was written by Tomas Rokicki to produce printable PostScript files from DVI input, and is now commonly used for general DVI conversion.

The TeX typesetting system outputs DVI files which are intended to be independent of the output device. In particular, they are not understood by printers and lack information such as font shapes. Thus, a converter (i.e., a backend) is needed to translate from a DVI file to a printer language. Although other DVI backends such as dvilj exist, dvips is one of the most common ways of printing DVI files. Another, more recent solution is the use of pdfTeX to directly generate PDF files, which have readers for most platforms. Given its importance, dvips is a standard part of most TeX distributions, such as teTeX, and TeX Live.

By using TeX \special commands, it is possible to directly insert "literal PostScript" into the DVI file and have such snippets of PostScript appear in the final file generated by dvips. This flexibility allows the user to include, say, watermarks on his document (especially via the use of proper packages) or further postprocess the PostScript file.

When producing postscript files, dvips embeds fonts inside the file. Most recent distributions will normally embed scalable fonts, also known as Type 1 fonts. Files generated with older distributions, however, may embed raster fonts. To substitute raster for scalable fonts in a postscript file in a situation where the original dvi file is unavailable use a utility called pkfix.
