= Source Han Sans =

Open-source sans-serif CJK typeface

- Category: Sans-serif
- Classification: East Asian gothic typeface
- Commissioned by: Adobe, Google
- Foundry: Adobe
- Date released: 16 July 2014; 12 years ago
- Glyphs: 65535
- License: Until v1.001: Apache License v2.0 Since v1.002: SIL Open Font License v.1.1
- Also known as: Noto Sans CJK
- Trademark: Adobe
- Latest release version: 2.005R
- Latest release date: 18 June 2025; 13 months ago

Source Han Sans

Chinese name
- Traditional Chinese: 思源黑體
- Simplified Chinese: 思源黑体
Transcriptions
Standard Mandarin
- Hanyu Pinyin: Sīyuán Hēitǐ
- Bopomofo: ㄙ ㄩㄢˊ ㄏㄟ ㄊㄧˇ
Yue: Cantonese
- Yale Romanization: sī yúhn hāk tái
- Jyutping: si1 jyun4 hak1 tai2

Korean name
- Hangul: 본고딕
Transcriptions
- Revised Romanization: Bongodik

Japanese name
- Kanji: 源ノ角ゴシック
- Hiragana: げんのかくごしっく
Transcriptions
- Revised Hepburn: Gen no Kaku Goshikku

Source Han Sans is a sans-serif gothic typeface family created by Adobe and Google. It is also released by Google under the Noto fonts project as Noto Sans CJK. The family includes seven weights, and supports Traditional Chinese, Simplified Chinese, Japanese and Korean. It also includes Latin, Greek and Cyrillic characters from the Source Sans family.

== Design ==
The Latin, Greek and Cyrillic characters are taken from the Source Sans Pro family, and adjusted to fit in with Chinese, Japanese and Korean (CJK) text. For example, in the normal weight Latin and Latin-like characters are scaled to 115% of their original size, hence they appear larger than Source Sans Pro at the same point size.

For the Chinese, Japanese and Korean characters, the underlying design was designed by Ryoko Nishizuka from Adobe. Multiple type foundries drew the glyphs for different languages based on the designs: Changzhou Sinotype and Arphic Technology for Chinese, Iwata Corporation for Japanese, and Sandoll Communications for Korean. Ken Lunde of Adobe consolidated the glyphs and created the final font resources, while Google provided funding, testing resources and input.

Differences for the character 返 between different versions of Source Han Sans

Source Han Sans has five versions: Simplified Chinese, Traditional Chinese for Taiwan, Traditional Chinese for Hong Kong, Japanese and Korean. Because of the different conventions and standards in each region, the same character in Unicode may have different shapes in different versions.

The font family includes seven font weights: ExtraLight, Light, Normal, Regular, Medium, Bold, and Heavy. At its release, the fonts contains 65,535 glyphs, the maximum limit for CID-based fonts.

The font currently covers all of the characters in Unified Repertoire and Ordering of the Unicode Standard in version 2.001, but still doesn't cover all of CJK Compatibility Ideographs and extensions of the CJK Unified Ideographs.

== Release ==
The 28-font OTC version of Source Sans Pro became available in version 1.001.

Source Han Sans version 2.000 is a major update of the font family, the major changes include:

- Several glyphs proposed for CJK Unified Ideographs Extension G were included and accessible via the 'ccmp' GSUB feature.
- The Hong Kong flavor of Traditional Chinese was introduced.
- The glyphs for bopomofo were redesigned.
- The glyphs for half-width jamo were replaced.
- Macintosh 'name' table strings were omitted.
- Regular weight is style-linked to the Bold weight.
- The deprecated 'hngl' GSUB feature was removed.
- The 'vert' GPOS (not GSUB) feature was added to support combining jamo in vertical writing.
- Some glyphs for newer versions of Unicode were added.

Version 2.001 added a new character stands for Japanese era name Reiwa, and several glyphs for Hong Kong locale.

Version 2.002 fixed some bugs, and also moved 4 of the CJK Unified Ideographs Extension G characters to their designated codepoint, with the corresponding 'ccmp' GSUB feature removed.

Version 2.003 introduced variable font format into Source Han Sans as .otc suffix with CFF2 format table, which caused display issues with Windows 10. A version of variable font with glyf format table and .ttc suffix is released in version 2.004 for Windows along with other minor fixes.

Version 2.005, released on June 18, 2025, updated the Latin glyphs to match those in Source Sans 3. The release also included a large number of glyph additions, removals, and adjustments for all supported languages, addressing over 80 distinct issues reported by the community. Notable additions include new characters from Unicode 15.1, such as Ideographic Description Characters and glyphs for CJK Unified Ideographs Extension H. This version also fixed several bugs related to the variable font format and improved the alignment and consistency of many radicals and components across the entire family.

Noto Sans CJK fonts are released as individual fonts separated by version and weight, or as OTC fonts containing all versions separated by weight, or OTC fonts containing all weights separated by version, or a single OTC font containing all versions and weights.

== Disputes ==
Before version 2.000, Source Han Sans only supported Japanese, Korean, Simplified Chinese and Traditional Chinese, and the initial name given to the Traditional Chinese version is Source Han Sans TWHK, which is the initials for Taiwan and Hong Kong. However the Traditional Chinese version is based on Taiwan's Standard Form of National Characters instead of traditional printing press style (or known as jiu zixing) which is widely used in Taiwan and Hong Kong or Hong Kong's List of Graphemes of Commonly-Used Chinese Characters. Both latter groups voiced their opinions and said that the name of TWHK is misleading, which later caused heated discussions between these users. It is later announced that Hong Kong (HK) version will be split with Taiwan (TW) version in 2015.

Source Han Sans version 2.000 introduced at November 2018 added Traditional Chinese (Hong Kong) as Source Han Sans HK/HC, which follows Hong Kong's List of Graphemes of Commonly-Used Chinese Characters, but no plans were announced to support traditional printing press style for Traditional Chinese users in Source Han Sans.

== Source Han Sans HW (2015) ==
Introduced as part of Source Han Sans Version 1.002 update, Source Han Sans HW fonts are based on the corresponding Source Han Sans fonts, but include half-width glyphs for ASCII and small number of additional characters in Regular and Bold font weights.

== Noto Sans Mono CJK ==
Noto Sans Mono CJK fonts are monospaced versions of Noto Sans CJK, which includes glyphs in 4 variants. Only regular and bold weight fonts were released.

Noto Sans Mono CJK was introduced in Noto Sans CJK version 1.002 package.

OTC fonts include Noto Sans Mono CJK, except for the region-specific Subset OTC fonts.

== Source Han Code JP (2015) ==
Source Han Code JP (Japanese: 源ノ角ゴシック Code JP) is a duospaced font family using Latin glyphs from Source Code Pro, with Latin glyphs are scaled to match Japanese characters, and their widths are adjusted to be exactly 667 units (two-thirds of an EM). The remaining characters were from Source Han Sans JP fonts with glyph set supporting only Japanese.

== See also ==
- Noto fonts
- Open-source Unicode typefaces

=== Adobe Open Source Fonts ===
- Source Sans
- Source Code Pro
- Source Serif
- Source Han Serif
