= Nimbus Roman No. 9 L =

Nimbus Roman
- Category: Serif
- Classification: Transitional
- Designers: URW Studio; (Stanley Morison, Victor Lardent); GPL published also by Valek Fillipov
- Foundry: URW++
- Date released: 1982 (1931)
- Design based on: Times New Roman
- Variations: URW Heisei Mincho
- Website: www.urwpp.de

Nimbus Roman is a serif typeface created by URW Studio in 1982.

Nimbus Roman No. 9 L is a serif typeface created by URW Studio in 1987, and eventually released under the GPL and AFPL (as Type 1 font for Ghostscript) in 1996 and LPPL in 2009. It features Normal, Bold, Italic, and Bold Italic weights, and is one of several freely licensed fonts offered by URW++.

Although the characters are not exactly the same, Nimbus Roman No. 9 L has metrics almost identical to Times New Roman and Times Roman. It is one of the Ghostscript fonts, a free alternative to 35 basic PostScript fonts (which include Times).

It is a standard typeface in many Linux distributions.

== See also ==
- Nimbus Mono L
- Nimbus Sans L
- Free software Unicode typefaces
