= LinuxTLE =

Thai Linux distribution

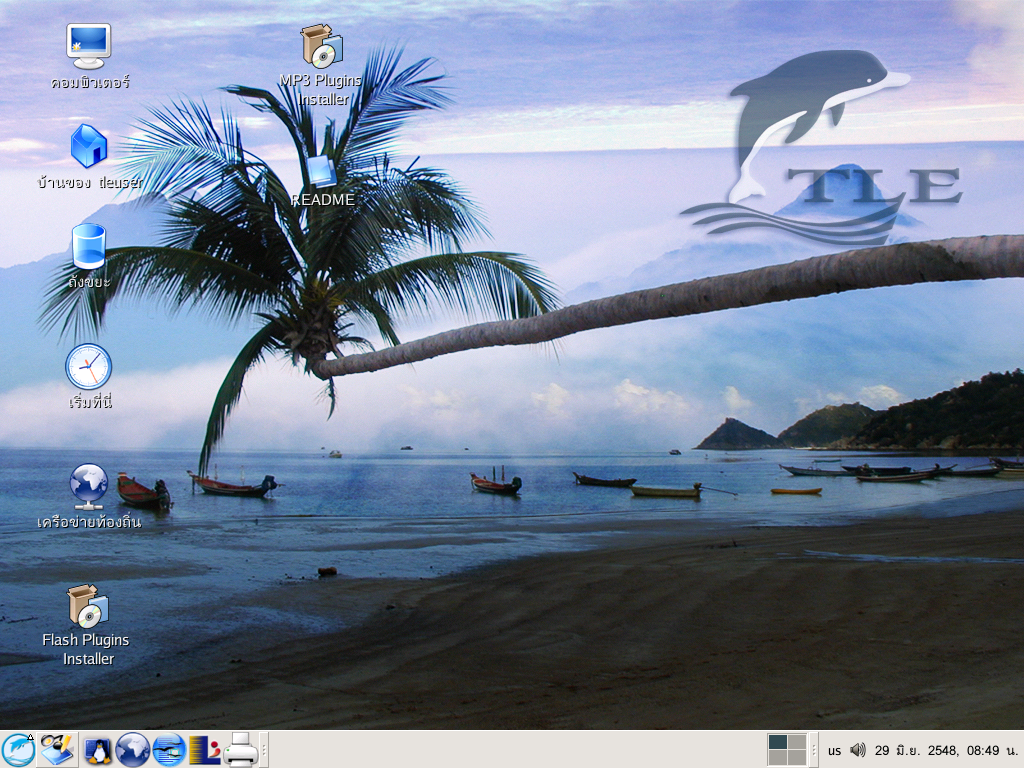
- Screenshot of OpenTLE Live CD 5.5
- Developer: NECTEC
- Working state: Discontinued
- Latest release: 10.0 / August 24, 2011
- License: Various
- Official website: OpenTLE/LinuxTLE-Website

LinuxTLE (ลินุกซ์ทะเล, /ˈlɪnəkstəleɪ/) is a discontinued Thai Linux distribution based on Ubuntu and developed by the Thailand National Electronics and Computer Technology Center (NECTEC).

TLE stands for Thai Language Extension, as it was originally a Thai extension for Red Hat Linux. The pronunciation "talay" is a homophone of the Thai word ทะเล (the sea).

== Version history ==
Name	Code Name	Base Distribution	Release date
MaTEL 6.0		Mandrake Linux 6.0	June 1999
MaTEL 6.1		Mandrake Linux 6.0	September 1999
LinuxTLE 3.0	ตะรุเตา (Tarutao)	Red Hat Linux 6.2	14 July 2000
LinuxTLE 4.0	สิมิลัน (Similan)	Redmond Linux	13 October 2001
LinuxTLE 4.1a	พีพี (PhiPhi)	Red Hat Linux 7.2	14 March 2002
LinuxTLE 4.1r2	พีพี (PhiPhi)	Red Hat Linux 7.3	March 2003
LinuxTLE 5.0	อันดามัน (Andaman)	Red Hat Linux 8	March 2003
LinuxTLE 5.5	สมิหลา (Samila)	Fedora CORE 1	January 2004
LinuxTLE 7.0	หว้ากอ (Waghor)	LinuxTLE 5.5	December 2004
LinuxTLE 8.0	ป่าตอง (Patong)	Ubuntu 6.10	27 February 2007
LinuxTLE 9.0	หัวหิน (Hua-Hin)	Ubuntu 7.10	8 February 2008
LinuxTLE 10.0	อ่าวนาง (Ao Nang)	Ubuntu 10.04	24 August 2011
