= Source Han Serif =

Open-source serif CJK typeface

- Category: Serif
- Classification: East Asian Song/Ming Typeface
- Commissioned by: Adobe, Google
- Foundry: Adobe
- Date created: 2017
- Date released: April 3, 2017; 8 years ago
- Glyphs: 65535
- License: SIL Open Font License v.1.1
- Trademark: Adobe
- Latest release version: 2.003R
- Latest release date: 31 July 2024; 19 months ago

Source Han Serif (also known as Noto Serif CJK) is a serif Song/Ming typeface created by Adobe and Google.

Source Han Serif

Chinese name
- Traditional Chinese: 思源宋體
- Simplified Chinese: 思源宋体
Transcriptions
Standard Mandarin
- Hanyu Pinyin: Sīyuán Sòngtǐ
- Bopomofo: ㄙ ㄩㄢˊ ㄙㄨㄥˋ ㄊㄧˇ

Korean name
- Hangul: 본명조
Transcriptions
- Revised Romanization: Bonmyeongjo

Japanese name
- Kanji: 源ノ明朝
- Hiragana: げんのみんちょう
Transcriptions
- Revised Hepburn: Gen no Minchō

== Design ==
Latin-script letters and numerals are from the Source Serif font. Changzhou SinoType Co., Ltd., Iwata Corporation and Sandoll Communications Inc. took part in the design and finished the work on Chinese (both Simplified and Traditional), Japanese and Korean glyphs.

The kana characters were designed by Ryoko Nishizuka of Adobe Systems Incorporated. Frank Grießhammer designed the Latin, Greek, and Cyrillic glyphs.

Ken Lunde from Adobe Systems Incorporated Specification worked on the glyph set, Unicode mappings and CJK glyph consolidation of the typeface.

Frank Grießhammer of Adobe Systems Incorporated provided additional Source Serif glyphs.

Design work for Source Han Serif began in late 2014, with 6 prereleases between 2015 and 2017.

Differences for the character 曜 between different versions of Source Han Serif

The font supports variant forms of Unicode, so the appropriate glyph can be used for each region.

== Font release ==
The font family includes seven font weights: ExtraLight 100, Light 200, Regular 300, Medium 400, SemiBold 500, Bold 700, and Heavy 900. The font contains 65,535 glyphs (the maximum possible in a TrueType font).

Other changes from Source Han Sans v1.004 include:

- Removal of seven glyphs involved in combining jamo.
- The 'vert' GPOS (not GSUB) feature was added to support combining jamo in vertical writing.
- The CJK kerning that is specified in the 'kern' and 'vkrn' GPOS features uses class kerning.
- Regular weight is style-linked to the Bold weight.
- XUID arrays were removed from the CIDFont resources, and are therefore not present in the 'CFF ' tables
- Macintosh 'name' table strings were omitted by invoking the AFDKO makeotf tool's "-omitMacNames" command-line option.
- The deprecated 'hngl' GSUB feature was omitted.
- The 'cmap' tables do not include mappings for the range U+0000 through U+001F.
- The Simplified Chinese fonts and font instances include a Format 14 'cmap' subtable that specifies nine Standardized Variants.
- The new subroutinizer in the Adobe Font Development Kit for OpenType tool tx was used to subroutinize the CFFs.
- The glyphs for two IRG Working Set 2015 characters, UTC-00791 and UTC-01312, were included and accessible via the 'ccmp' GSUB feature.
- The glyph for Copyleft symbol was included.

== Noto Serif CJK (2017) ==
The Google version of the font family include 43,029 encoded characters and includes 65,535 glyphs. OpenType features included vertical text layout support (compliant with Unicode vertical text layout standard).

Simplified Chinese fonts support GB 18030, 2013 List of Commonly Used Standard Chinese Characters.

Traditional Chinese fonts support Big5, Taiwan Ministry of Education glyph standard.

Japanese fonts support JIS X 0208, JIS X 0213, and JIS X 0212, Adobe-Japan1-6.

Korean fonts support CJK ideographs in KS X 1001 and KS X 1002.

Noto Serif CJK fonts are released as individual fonts separated by language and weight, or as OTC fonts containing all language variants separated by weight, or OTC fonts containing all weights separated by language, or a single OTC font containing all languages and weights.

== Derivative works ==
- GenEi Koburi Mincho (源暎こぶり明朝): Based on Source Han Serif JP Regular, Linux Libertine Regular. Changes include shrunken hiragana glyphs, katakana glyphs shrunken by 5%, stroke terminals of katakana glyphs were altered to match hiragana glyphs, redesigned alphanumeric glyphs, reduce ideogram sizes by 2.3%, introduction of hair serifs in ideograms altered from Kozuka Mincho family starting in version 2.1. Available in TTF (GenEi Koburi Mincho TTF) and OTF formats.
- GenYoMin (源樣明體/源様明朝): It is a version of Source Han Serif, with ideograms identical to a classical Chinese type design prior to the Standard Form of National Characters by the Ministry of Education of the Republic of China (Taiwan). Available in TTF format.
- GenRyuMin (源流明體/源流明朝): It is a version of Source Han Serif, with similar type design to GenYoMin, but the ideograms looks a bit narrow within character frame, leaves wider spacing between the ideograms, added more wedge serifs in ideograms. Available in TTF format.
- GenWanMin (源雲明體/源雲明朝): It is a version of Source Han Serif, with similar type design to GenYoMin, but the ideograms looks sightly rounded at corners. Available in TTF format.

== See also ==
- Noto fonts
- Open-source Unicode typefaces

=== Adobe's open source family ===
- Source Sans, the first member of Adobe's open source family.
- Source Code Pro, the second member of Adobe's open source family.
- Source Serif, the third member of Adobe's open source family.
- Source Han Sans, the fourth member of Adobe's open source family and the first to include CJK characters.
