= Source Sans =

Sans-serif typeface family

- Category: Sans-serif
- Classification: Grotesque, Humanist
- Designer: Paul D. Hunt
- Foundry: Adobe Inc.
- Date created: 2012
- License: SIL Open Font License
- Design based on: Franklin Gothic; News Gothic
- Variations: Source Han Sans
- Website: github.com/adobe-fonts/source-sans
- Latest release version: v3.052
- Latest release date: March 30, 2023; 3 years ago

Source Sans (known as Source Sans Pro before 2021) is a sans-serif typeface created by Paul D. Hunt, released by Adobe in 2012. It is the first open-source font family from Adobe, distributed under the SIL Open Font License.

The typeface is inspired by the forms of the American Type Founders' gothics by Morris Fuller Benton, such as News Gothic, Lightline Gothic and Franklin Gothic, modified with both a larger x-height and character width and more humanist-influenced italic forms. It is available in seven weights (Regular, ExtraLight, Light, Medium, Semibold, Bold, Black) in upright and italic styles, and is also available as a variable font with continuous weight values from 200 to 900. The typeface has wide language support for Latin script, including Western and Eastern European languages, Vietnamese, pinyin romanization of Chinese, and Navajo. Adobe's training material highlights it as having a more consistent colour on the page than the rather condensed News Gothic it is based on.

== See also ==
- Benton Sans – another commercial Benton revival, optimised for various weights, widths and optical masters for various sizes of text
- Trade Gothic – Linotype's competing design

=== Adobe's open source family ===
- Source Code Pro, the second member of Adobe's open source family, a monospaced sans serif
- Source Serif, the third member of Adobe's open source family
- Source Han Sans, the fourth member of Adobe's open source family and the first to include CJK characters
- Source Han Serif, the last member of Adobe's open source family and includes CJK characters
