= URW Type Foundry =

German type foundry

URW Type Foundry GmbH
- Type: GmbH
- Industry: Type foundry
- Founded: 1 January 1996; 30 years ago
- Headquarters: Berlin
- Parent: Monotype Imaging
- Website: www.urwtype.com/

URW Type Foundry GmbH (formerly URW++ Design & Development GmbH) is a type foundry based in Hamburg, Germany. The foundry has its own library with more than 500 font families. The company specializes in customized corporate typefaces and the development of non-Latin fonts. It has been owned by Monotype Imaging since May 2020.

== History ==
URW was founded in 1971 by Gerhard Rubow and Jürgen Weber as a management consultancy, Rubow Weber GmbH. Soon, Peter Karow joined as a third partner and later the company was renamed URW Software & Type GmbH (short: URW, which stands for Unternehmensberatung Rubow Weber). In the following years, products were developed in the graphics industry: typesetting and layout programs for publishers for the use of Digiset, and software for the Chromacom image processing system developed by Hell Verein Kiel.

In 1983, URW developed a system for cutting different lettering and figures into colored, self-adhesive foils for outdoor advertising. In 1975, Ikarus, a program that can digitally store the contours of a letter together with all necessary information for electronic typesetting, was introduced, becoming a standard in the type industry. For the revision and manipulation of single letters or whole groups of characters, URW developed a graphical editor and a multitude of programs to make fonts digitally available for different typesetting systems.

=== Formation of font library ===
In addition to software development, URW began to build its own font library. This started in 1975 in cooperation with Letraset and later with the International Typeface Corporation. This offered Karow the possibility to digitize the ITC designers' final artwork, which had to be photographed and prepared by each individual typesetting system manufacturer for their respective program at the time of phototypesetting, and to make the reproduction-ready originals cut on plotters available to all manufacturers. It was only through DTP that these digital data, initially intended for analogue use, took on a new meaning.

URW continuously expanded its digital font library, and also became known for making some of its fonts available to the open source community as free fonts. Examples include Ghostscript fonts, the most commonly known of which are Nimbus Mono L, Nimbus Roman No9 L, and Nimbus Sans L. Some popular free fonts included in modern open-source systems are partially based on the Ghostscript/Nimbus fonts, such as GNU FreeFont and TeX Gyre.

URW was involved in a 1995 lawsuit with Monotype Corporation for cloning its fonts and naming them with a name starting with the same three letters. As typeface shapes themselves cannot be copyrighted in the United States, the lawsuit centered on trademark infringement. A US court decided that URW was deliberately confusing the public because "the purloining of the first part of a well-known trademark and the appending of it to a worthless suffix is a method of trademark poaching long condemned by the courts". The court issued an injunction preventing URW from using its chosen names.

=== URW++ ===
After URW filed for bankruptcy in early 1995, Peter Rosenfeld founded URW++ on March 1 that year. On 1 January 1 1996, he transferred the sole proprietorship, together with Dr. Jürgen Willrodt, Jochen Lau and Svend Bang, into a Gesellschaft mit beschränkter Haftung.

URW++ was sold to Global Graphics plc in 2016 and renamed URW Type Foundry GmbH in 2018. Until 2019, Peter Rosenfeld was the sole managing director of URW Type Foundry. URW Type Foundry was sold to Monotype Imaging in May 2020.

At the time of the sale, URW held rights to thousands of original fonts, including increasingly non-Latin fonts. Of particular importance were its established relationships with Chinese and Japanese companies, for which URW developed a special software for editing Chinese characters.

URW was involved in the development of corporate typefaces for Daimler, Siemens, Deutsche Telekom, General Motors, and Activision Blizzard.
