= Tai Le (Unicode block) =

- Range: U+1950..U+197F (48 code points)
- Plane: BMP
- Scripts: Tai Le
- Major alphabets: Tai Le
- Assigned: 35 code points
- Unused: 13 reserved code points

Unicode version history
- 4.0 (2003): 35 (+35)

Unicode documentation
- Code chart ∣ Web page

Tai Le is a Unicode block containing characters for writing the Tai Le language.

Tai Le^{[1]}^{[2]} Official Unicode Consortium code chart (PDF)
	0	1	2	3	4	5	6	7	8	9	A	B	C	D	E	F
U+195x	ᥐ	ᥑ	ᥒ	ᥓ	ᥔ	ᥕ	ᥖ	ᥗ	ᥘ	ᥙ	ᥚ	ᥛ	ᥜ	ᥝ	ᥞ	ᥟ
U+196x	ᥠ	ᥡ	ᥢ	ᥣ	ᥤ	ᥥ	ᥦ	ᥧ	ᥨ	ᥩ	ᥪ	ᥫ	ᥬ	ᥭ		
U+197x	ᥰ	ᥱ	ᥲ	ᥳ	ᥴ											
Notes: 1. As of Unicode version 16.0; 2. Grey areas indicate non-assigned code points

== History ==
The following Unicode-related documents record the purpose and process of defining specific characters in the Tai Le block:

Version	Final code points (Note: Proposed code points and characters names may differ from final code points and names)	Count	L2 ID	WG2 ID	Document
4.0	U+1950..196D, 1970..1974	35		N966	Proposal for encoding Dehong Dai script, 1994-01-01
4.0	U+1950..196D, 1970..1974	35	L2/00-281	N2239	Proposal for encoding Dehong Dai script on BMP of ISO/IEC 10646, 2000-08-08
4.0	U+1950..196D, 1970..1974	35	L2/00-361	N2239R	Proposal for encoding Dehong Dai script on BMP of ISO/IEC 10646, 2000-08-08
4.0	U+1950..196D, 1970..1974	35	L2/00-347	N2292	Everson, Michael; Xi, Weining; Zhao, Qinglian (2000-09-25), Report on Tai Le (Dehong Dai) script
4.0	U+1950..196D, 1970..1974	35	L2/01-050	N2253	Umamaheswaran, V. S. (2001-01-21), "7.11 Proposal for encoding Dehong Dai script", Minutes of the SC2/WG2 meeting in Athens, September 2000
4.0	U+1950..196D, 1970..1974	35	L2/01-348	N2371	Proposal Summary Form for Dai scripts, 2001-09-14
4.0	U+1950..196D, 1970..1974	35	L2/01-369	N2372	Everson, Michael (2001-10-05), Revised proposal for encoding the Tai Le script in the BMP of the UCS
4.0	U+1950..196D, 1970..1974	35	L2/01-420		Whistler, Ken (2001-10-30), "b. Tai Le script", WG2 (Singapore) Resolution Consent Docket for UTC
4.0	U+1950..196D, 1970..1974	35	L2/01-405R		Moore, Lisa (2001-12-12), "Consensus 89-C21", Minutes from the UTC/L2 meeting in Mountain View, November 6-9, 2001, "The UTC accepts the encoding of the Tai Le collection of characters with names (TAI LE LETTER..) and code points (1950..196D, 1970..1974) as described in section 3b, L2/01-420."
4.0	U+1950..196D, 1970..1974	35	L2/02-154	N2403	Umamaheswaran, V. S. (2002-04-22), "7.6", Draft minutes of WG 2 meeting 41, Hotel Phoenix, Singapore, 2001-10-15/19
4.0	U+1950..196D, 1970..1974	35	L2/03-253		Kai, Daniel (2003-08-13), Lepcha, Limbu, Syloti, Saurashtra, Tai Le and Bugis Proposals
4.0	U+1950..196D, 1970..1974	35	L2/03-258		Kai, Daniel (2003-08-13), Introduction to the Tai Le Script
