= GPL font exception =

Optional clause for the GNU General Public License

- A community-made icon for the GPL+FE
- Author: David "Novalis" Turner
- Publisher: Free Software Foundation
- Published: April 20, 2005; 21 years ago
- SPDX identifier: Font-exception-2.0
- FSF approved: Yes
- GPL compatible: Yes
- Copyleft: Yes
- Website: www.gnu.org/licenses/gpl-faq.html#FontException

The GPL font exception clause (or GPL+FE, for short) is an optional clause that can be added to the GNU General Public License (GNU GPL) permitting digital fonts shared with that license to be embedded within a digital document file without requiring the document itself to also be shared with GPL. Without the clause, conflicts may arise with open-source projects distributing digital fonts which may be used in desktop publishing. As explained by Dave Crossland in Libre Graphics Magazine: "A copyleft font may overreach into the documents that use it, unless an exception is made to the normal terms; an additional permission to allow people to combine parts of a font with a document without affecting the license of texts, photographs, illustrations and designs. Most libre fonts today have such a copyleft license – the SIL OFL or GNU GPL with the Font Exception described in the GPL FAQ."

== Origin ==
The font exception was authored in April 2005 by David "Novalis" Turner, a Free Software Foundation GPL compliance engineer. As he explains, "The situation we were considering was one where a font was embedded in a document (rather than merely referenced). Embedding allows a document to be viewed as the author intended it even on machines that don't have that font installed. So, the document (a copyrighted work) would be derived from the font program (another work). The text of the document, of course, would be unrestricted when distributed without the font."

To be in compliance with the GPL, Red Hat's Fedora Linux project included the font exception with the license for its Liberation font package, albeit with additional restrictions in 2007. These restrictions prompted further discussion among the Debian GNU/Linux distribution's community members concerning the GPL+FE. This attention prompted Ubuntu to follow suit and create the Ubuntu Font License because they were not satisfied with either the SIL OFL or with GPL+FE.

== Usage ==
To indicate a font exception to the GPL, a digital font creator adds the following language to the end of the GPL text distributed with their font:

As a special exception, if you create a document which uses this font, and embed this font or unaltered portions of this font into the document, this font does not by itself cause the resulting document to be covered by the GNU General Public License. This exception does not however invalidate any other reasons why the document might be covered by the GNU General Public License. If you modify this font, you may extend this exception to your version of the font, but you are not obligated to do so. If you do not wish to do so, delete this exception statement from your version.

== See also ==
- SIL Open Font License (created November 2005)
