= Aladdin Free Public License =

Software license based on the GPL

- Latest version: 9
- Publisher: Aladdin Enterprises
- Published: September 18, 2000
- SPDX identifier: Aladdin
- Debian FSG compatible: No
- FSF approved: No
- OSI approved: No
- GPL compatible: No

The Aladdin Free Public License (AFPL) is a license written by L. Peter Deutsch for his Ghostscript PostScript language interpreter.

== History ==
The license was derived from the GNU General Public License, but differs on two key points:

- The source code must be included with any software distribution.
- The software may not be sold, including any fees involved with distribution.

Deutsch chose to include a commercial restriction in the AFPL based on his observation of people including Ghostscript in commercial products without full license compliance. Recent versions of Ghostscript are not licensed under the AFPL.

Despite the name, the Free Software Foundation does not consider the AFPL a free software license, neither the OSI consider it an open-source license, nor does it fall under the Copyfree Standard definition. The AFPL can be considered a source-available license.

== See also ==
- Dual-licensing
