= LaTeX Project Public License =

Free software license

- Author: LaTeX project
- Latest version: 1.3c
- Publisher: LaTeX project
- Published: May 4, 2008; 18 years ago
- SPDX identifier: LPPL-1.0, LPPL-1.1, LPPL-1.2, LPPL-1.3a, LPPL-1.3c
- Debian FSG compatible: Yes
- FSF approved: Yes
- OSI approved: Yes
- GPL compatible: No
- Copyleft: No
- Linking from code with a different license: Yes
- Website: latex-project.org/lppl/

The LaTeX Project Public License (LPPL) is a free and open source software software license originally written for the LaTeX system. It is not a copyleft license.

Besides the LaTeX base system, the LPPL is also used for most third-party LaTeX packages. Software projects other than LaTeX rarely use it.

== Unique features of the license ==
The LPPL grew from Donald Knuth's original license for TeX, which states that the source code for TeX may be used for any purpose but a system built with it can only be called 'TeX' if it strictly conforms to his canonical program. The incentive for this provision was to ensure that documents written for TeX will be readable for the foreseeable future – and TeX and its extensions will still compile documents written from the early 1980s to produce output exactly as intended. Quoting Frank Mittelbach, the main author of the license: "LPPL attempts to preserve the fact that something like LaTeX is a language which is used for communication, that is if you write a LaTeX document you expect to be able to send it to me and to work at my end like it does at yours".

The most unusual part of the LPPL – and equally the most controversial – used to be the 'filename clause': You must not distribute the modified file with the filename of the original file. This feature made some people deny that the LPPL is a free software license. In particular the Debian community considered in 2003 excluding LaTeX from its core distribution because of this.

However, version 1.3 of the LPPL has weakened this restriction. Now it is only necessary that modified components identify themselves "clearly and unambiguously" as modified versions, both in the source and also when called in some sort of interactive mode. A name change of the work is still recommended, however.

In order to provide project continuity in the case that the copyright holder no longer wishes to maintain the work, maintenance can be passed on to another (or from maintainer to maintainer). This can either be declared by the copyright holder or, in the event that the copyright holder is no longer able to be contacted, by the individual taking over maintenance, with a three-month gap after their public intention to take over the maintenance. The modifying clause discussed above does not hold for the current maintainer of the work.

== Copyright of text ==
The LaTeX project permits the verbatim redistribution of the text of the LPPL, but do not permit distributing modifications of it.

== See also ==
- Software using the LaTeX Project Public License (category)
