= Croscore fonts =

Open-source typeface family

Arimo
- Category: Sans serif
- Classification: Neo-grotesque
- Designer: Steve Matteson
- Foundry: Ascender Corporation
- License: Apache License 2.0
- Variations: Liberation Sans
- Website: fonts.google.com/specimen/Arimo
- Metrically compatible with: Arial; Helvetica

Tinos
- Category: Serif
- Classification: Transitional
- Foundry: Ascender Corporation
- License: Apache License 2.0
- Variations: Liberation Serif
- Website: fonts.google.com/specimen/Tinos
- Metrically compatible with: Times New Roman Times

Cousine
- Category: Monospaced
- Classification: Sans-serif; Neo-grotesque
- Foundry: Ascender Corporation
- License: Apache License 2.0
- Variations: Liberation Mono
- Website: fonts.google.com/specimen/Cousine
- Metrically compatible with: Courier New Courier

Caladea
- Category: Serif
- Foundry: Huerta Tipográfica
- License: SIL Open Font License 1.1
- Design based on: Cambo
- Website: fonts.google.com/specimen/Caladea
- Metrically compatible with: Cambria

Carlito
- Category: Sans serif
- Classification: Humanist
- Designer: Łukasz Dziedzic
- License: SIL Open Font License 1.1
- Design based on: Lato
- Website: fonts.google.com/specimen/Carlito
- Metrically compatible with: Calibri

The ChromeOS core fonts, also known as the Croscore fonts, are a collection of three TrueType font families: Arimo (sans-serif), Tinos (serif) and Cousine (monospace). These fonts are metrically compatible with Monotype Corporation's Arial, Times New Roman, and Courier New, the most commonly used fonts on Microsoft Windows, for which they are intended as open-source substitutes.

Google licenses these fonts from Ascender Corporation under the Apache License 2.0.

The fonts were originally developed by Steve Matteson as Ascender Sans and Ascender Serif, and were also the basis for the Liberation fonts licensed by Red Hat under another open source license. In July 2012, version 2.0 of the Liberation fonts, based on the Croscore fonts, was released under the SIL Open Font License.

The fonts are also available at the Noto fonts repository at GitHub.

== Crosextra fonts ==
A comparison between Calibri and Carlito in some of the more different glyphs.

In 2013, Google released an additional Crosextra (ChromeOS Extra) package, featuring Carlito (which matches Microsoft's Calibri) and Caladea (matching Cambria). These two fonts are respectively metric-adjusted versions of Lato and Cambo, both available at Google Fonts.

== See also ==
- Droid, a font family by the same font designer
- Liberation fonts, related metric-compatible font families also made by Ascender Corporation
