= Aptos (typeface) =

Neo-grotesque sans-serif typeface

- Sample of the Aptos typeface
- Category: Sans-serif
- Classification: Neo-grotesque
- Designer: Steve Matteson
- Commissioned by: Microsoft
- Foundry: Microsoft Corporation
- Date created: 2019
- Date released: 2023; 3 years ago
- License: Proprietary
- Design based on: Helvetica; Arial
- Also known as: Bierstadt

Aptos, originally named Bierstadt, is a sans-serif typeface in the neo-grotesque style developed by Steve Matteson. In 2023, it became the new default font for the Microsoft Office suite, replacing the previously used Calibri font.

Aptos, as well as its variants Aptos Display, Aptos Narrow, Aptos Mono (a monospaced font), Aptos Serif (serif font), and Aptos Slab (Slab serif font), are available to Microsoft 365 subscribers via Microsoft's cloud service.

== Characteristics ==
Aptos is available in the following styles: Light, Light Italic, Regular, Italic, Semibold, Semibold Italic, Bold, Bold Italic, Extrabold, Extrabold Italic, Black, and Black Italic.

The typeface has several distinct characteristics which make the typeface easily readable.

- It has horizontal and vertical stroke endings based on Helvetica as opposed to the slanted stroke ending of Arial.
- It removed the distinctive tail of the lowercase letter "a" and added it to the lowercase letter "l" (L), as in the lowercase letter "t", which prevents homoglyph confusion with the uppercase letter "I" (i).
- The shapes of the uppercase letters in "O" and "R" and the lowercase letter "a" are slightly irregular.
- It has a double-story lowercase letter "g" with an angled stem instead of the single-story letter, as in Helvetica, and the uppercase letter "G" is rounded and has no spur.
- Little swing tail of uppercase letter "R".
- Lowercase letters "b", "c", and "p" and the uppercase letter "C" have wide contours.
- It has circular dot in punctuations, diacritics, and tittles in lowercase letters "i" and "j" as opposed to the square dots in Arial and Helvetica.
- The curved top flag of the numeral "1" is based on Arial.
- Slanted stem of the numeral "7".
- The curved tail of the uppercase letter "Q" meets its counter.

Aptos includes characters from Latin, Latin script in Unicode, Greek, and Cyrillic script. The Italic type of Aptos have been individually redrawn, rather than mechanically slanted. The italic does not have cursive forms except Cyrillic scripts; instead, the letter shapes are oblique forms of the upright letters, as opposed to the true italic form of Calibri.

== History ==
Aptos was originally named Bierstadt, after Mount Bierstadt of the Rocky Mountains in Colorado. It is based on typical Swiss fonts from the mid-20th century. The font was intended to evoke a sense of the Helvetica and Arial fonts. It was introduced in 2021 alongside four other fonts (Grandview, Seaford, Skeena and Tenorite) for the Microsoft Office and Microsoft 365 applications. As a result, Bierstadt was considered a potential successor to the Microsoft Office standard font Calibri.

In July 2023, Microsoft announced that Bierstadt would succeed Calibri, although it would be renamed after Aptos, California. It has been argued that Calibri had a "friendly" feeling that could skew writer intent, whereas Aptos could display a writer's words in a "clear and neutral" tone.

== Availability ==
Aptos, Aptos Display, Aptos Narrow, Aptos Mono, Aptos Serif, and Aptos Slab, along with the original Bierstadt, Grandview, Seaford, Skeena and Tenorite are available to Microsoft 365 subscribers via Microsoft's cloud service. A locally installed version of Aptos is also available from Microsoft.

== Criticisms ==
Aptos has been known to have issues with collision avoidance in word processors when using italicized and non-italicized words in the same sentence.
