= Steve Matteson =

American typeface designer (born 1965)

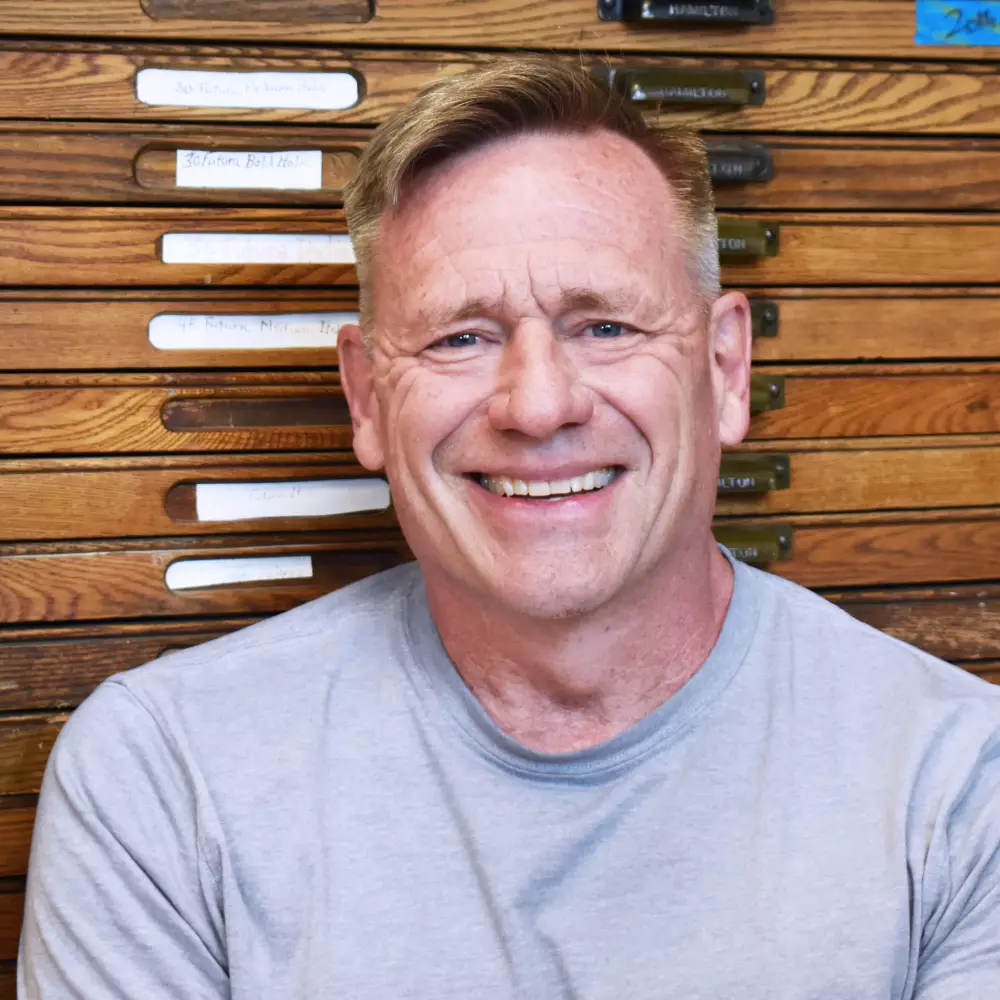
- Matteson in 2025
- Born: 1965 (age 60–61); Chicago, Illinois, U.S.
- Occupation: Typeface designer

Steven R. Matteson (born 1965) is an American typeface designer whose work is included in several computer operating systems and embedded in game consoles, cell phones and other electronic devices. He has created bespoke fonts for major brands including Toyota, Unilever, Google, and Microsoft.

For Microsoft, he designed the font family Segoe, included since Windows XP, Aptos, which became the default font in Microsoft Office Suite in 2023, and he also designed the brand and user-interface fonts used in both the original Microsoft Xbox and the Xbox 360. For Google, Matteson designed the Droid font collection used in the Android mobile device platform.

== Biography ==
Matteson is a 1988 graduate of Rochester Institute of Technology where he studied typography, design and printing. Upon graduation, he spent two years learning font hinting technology while employed at laser-printer manufacturer QMS.

In 1990 Matteson began work at Monotype Corporation (later Agfa-Monotype) contributing to the creation of the Windows 3.1x core TrueType fonts: Arial, Times New Roman and Courier New. Matteson produced fonts (such as Goudy Ornate and Gill Floriated Capitals) and directed custom-font design for companies including Agilent Technologies, Symantec and Microsoft. Matteson designed Andalé Mono as a mono-spaced command line and coding font for Taligent. The font is now bundled with Mac OS X and was one of the original Core fonts for the Web.

Matteson directed custom-type development for Agfa-Monotype until 2003. In 2004, he became a founding partner and Director of Type Design at Ascender Corporation in Elk Grove Village, Illinois. In 2005, Matteson designed the font family Convection for use in the branding and user-interface of Microsoft's Xbox 360 game console. Matteson also designed the user-interface font used in Microsoft's Zune music player.

Open Sans is one of Matteson's most widely used typefaces

In 2007 software maker Red Hat released the open-source Liberation fonts family designed by Matteson. Also in 2007, Matteson designed the Droid family of fonts included in the Android mobile-phone platform supported by the Open Handset Alliance.

In 2010, Monotype acquired Ascender, bringing Matteson back to Monotype. During his time at Monotype, he was Creative Type Director and created many custom typefaces for worldwide clients including Toyota, Barnes & Noble, Motorola, Google, Microsoft, Rogers Communications, John Deere, Quicken and others. Human Machine Interface design was a focus for Monotype at the time and Matteson worked with multiple automotive clients. In 2014, Matteson performed legibility studies with MIT’s AgeLab to research the impact of choice of typeface on driver safety.

Matteson left Monotype in 2020 to found his own company, Matteson Typographics. His typeface Aptos became the new default font for Microsoft Office in 2024 (announced 2023), after being initially introduced in 2021 as one of several candidate fonts. Since 2015, Matteson has been a typography and letterpress instructor at The Book Arts League in Boulder, Colorado. In 2025, Matteson was appointed as the 2025–27 Melbert B. Cary, Jr. Distinguished Professor of Graphic Arts at RIT.

== Typographic notes ==
Matteson has a deep appreciation for the work of Frederic Goudy and many of his releases from Matteson Typographics are modern interpretations of Goudy’s lesser-known typefaces.

Google Easter egg: If a user searches "Open Sans" or "Steve Matteson" in Google's search engine, it will change the search results to the Open Sans font.

== Fonts designed by Steve Matteson ==
- Agilent Sans for Agilent branding
- Albany
- Alcon Sans for Alcon
- Andalé Sans
  - Andalé Mono
- Andy
- AP Variable for the Associated Press
- Aptos (Bierstadt as Office cloud font)
  - Aptos Mono
  - Aptos Serif
  - Aptos Slab
- Arastradero
- Ashley Crawford
- Ascender Sans
  - Ascender Sans Bold
  - Ascender Serif
  - Ascender Serif Bold
- Baskerville eText (ships in Amazon Kindle)
- Baskerville Sans
- Bertham
- Binner Gothic
- Blueprint
- Bumble for Bumble branding
- Cambria
  - Cambria Bold
- Carneo
- Cepheid Sans for Cepheid (company) branding
- Chicory
- Citrix Sans for Citrix branding
- Coladero
- Companion
- Croscore Fonts
  - Arimo, Cousine, Tinos
- Cumberland
- Curlz
- Dreyfus Sans
- Droid
  - Droid Sans
  - Droid Sans Mono
  - Droid Serif
- Dujour
- Elkdale
- Endurance
- Facade
- Fairbanks Chancery
- Fineprint
- Firth
- Frame Gothic
- Friar
- Futura Now
- Georgia Pro (collaboration with Matthew Carter)
- Gill Facia
- Gill Floriated
- Goudy Fleurons
- Goudy Lanston
- Goudy Lining Gothic
- Goudy Modern Now
- Goudy National
- Goudy Ornate
- Goudy Titling
- Goudy Type
- Goudy Village
- Hasbro for Hasbro branding
- HCAHealthcare for HCA Healthcare branding
- Highmore
- InkFree for Microsoft
- JD Sans for John Deere branding
- Kenworth for Kenworth branding
- Kidprint
- Kootenay
- Koufeto (for LeapFrog Enterprises)
- Lebeau
- Liberation Sans
  - Liberation Mono
  - Liberation Serif
- LimeRock for Barnes & Noble
- Lindsay
- Littleworth (revival of F. L. Griggs design for Monotype Imaging)
- Louisville Script
- LubDub (for American Heart Association)
- Majalla (for Microsoft)
- Massif
- Mayberry
- MFB Thermo
- Miramonte
- Monotype Grotesque Display Bold Extended
  - Monotype Grotesque Display Condensed
- Motorola SCPL (for Motorola Mobility)
- MS Highway (for Microsoft)
- NAPA for NAPA Auto Parts branding
- Newstyle
- NII Sans & Serif (for Nextel branding)
- Noto Sans for Latin
- OMV for OMV branding
- Open Sans
  - Open Sans Condensed
  - OpenSansTV for Xperi
  - Open Sans Soft
  - Open Serif
- Othello
- Parshall
- Pedigree for Pedigree Petfoods branding
- Pericles (revival of design by Robert Foster for American Type Founders)
- Pescadero
- Peterbilt for Peterbilt branding
- Pier52
- Provan
- Rocket Sans for Rocket Mortgage branding
- Rockwell Team
- Ruggles
- Sago Mini (for Sago branding)
- Schwab Sans (for Charles Schwab Corporation)
- Scooter
- Segoe (for Microsoft branding and user interface
- Shilling Sans (for Unilever branding)
- Skoda for Skoda Auto branding
- Spectrum (revival of design by Jan van Krimpen)
- Split Rail
- Sweet Nancy
- Symantec Sans for Symantec Security branding
  - Symantec Serif for Symantec Security branding
- Tarweed
- Tipperary for Mazda user interface
- Titan
- Titanium
- Toyota Type for Toyota branding
- Truesdell
  - Truesdell Ornaments
- Tucker
- Twentieth Century Poster
- Union Station
- Vallecito
- Voltava based on design by Jaroslav Benda
- Xbox Display for original Xbox console
  - Xbox Sans
  - Convection for Xbox 360
