= Venus (typeface) =

Grotesque sans-serif typeface

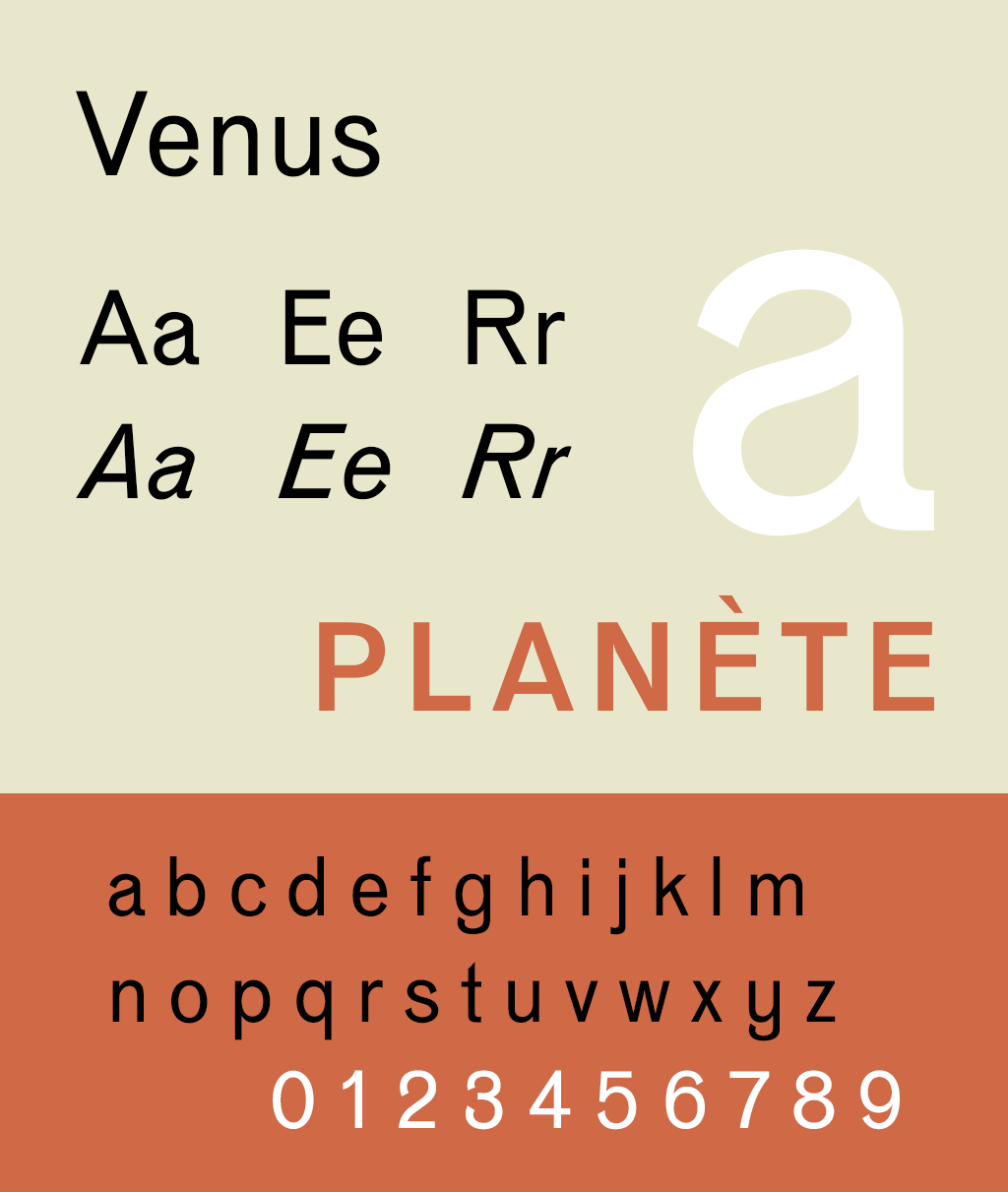
- Category: Sans-serif
- Classification: Grotesque
- Designer: Bauer Type Foundry
- Foundry: Bauersche Gießerei
- Date created: 1907
- Re-issuing foundries: URW Type Foundry; Mergenthaler Linotype

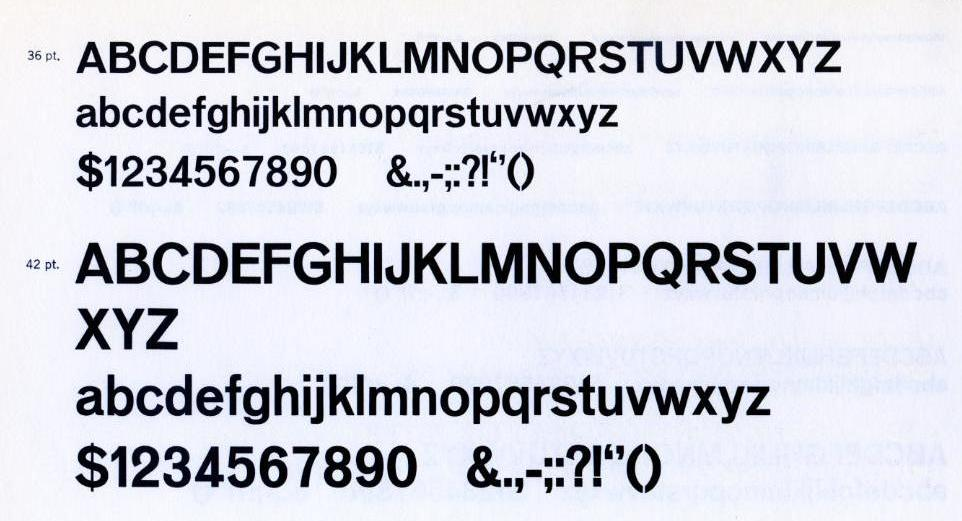
Venus Bold on an American metal type specimen sheet. Shown are the recut 'E' and 'F' with vertical rather than diagonal terminals on the horizontal strokes.

Venus or Venus-Grotesk is a sans-serif typeface family released by the Bauer Type Foundry of Frankfurt am Main, Germany from 1907 onwards. (Note: Some sources say 1906.) Released in a large range of styles, including condensed and extended weights, it was very popular in the early-to-mid twentieth century. It was exported to other countries, notably the United States, where it was distributed by Bauer Alphabets Inc, the U.S. branch of the firm.

== Design ==
Like other "grotesque" typefaces of the period such as Akzidenz-Grotesk of the Berthold Type Foundry, Venus has a minimal, 'neutral' design, with a monoline structure and an absence of flourishes. However, compared to many later sans-serifs, such as Helvetica and Univers, it has a more irregular design, with stroke terminals at a variety of angles rather than generally exactly horizontal or vertical. A notable feature is the distinctive motif of unusually high-waisted capitals, visible in the 'R', 'G', and 'E'. Walter Tracy describes this as similar to some of the much more adorned Art Nouveau and Secessionist lettering of the period.

Original versions had sheared horizontal stroke terminals on 'E' and 'F', but in the later metal-type period it was sold with alternate capitals without these. The 'g' is single-storey and the sloped form is an oblique, rather than a true italic. A double-storey 'g' was also available as an alternate character.

== Usage ==
A prominent use of it was Jan Tschichold's second book, Eine Stunde Druckgestaltung (1930), which used it for body text. It was also used in other avant-garde printing of the period. Sainsbury's, a major United Kingdom supermarket chain, used Venus in its logo for many years.

== Digital versions and derivatives ==
Several digitisations have been released based on various styles of the family. Monotype's 1920s Grotesque 215 and 216 series, created for their hot metal typesetting system, were also reportedly loosely based on it; the standard Windows typeface Arial is influenced by them.

In 2007, David Berlow published the "Vonness" typeface, closely based on the Venus typeface. Eric Olson designed the Coordinates typeface, a monospaced sans-serif typeface based on the Venus typeface. Parachute Type Foundry designed the PF Grand Gothik Variable typeface, a blend of Venus and Interstate, with OpenType features.

== Gallery ==
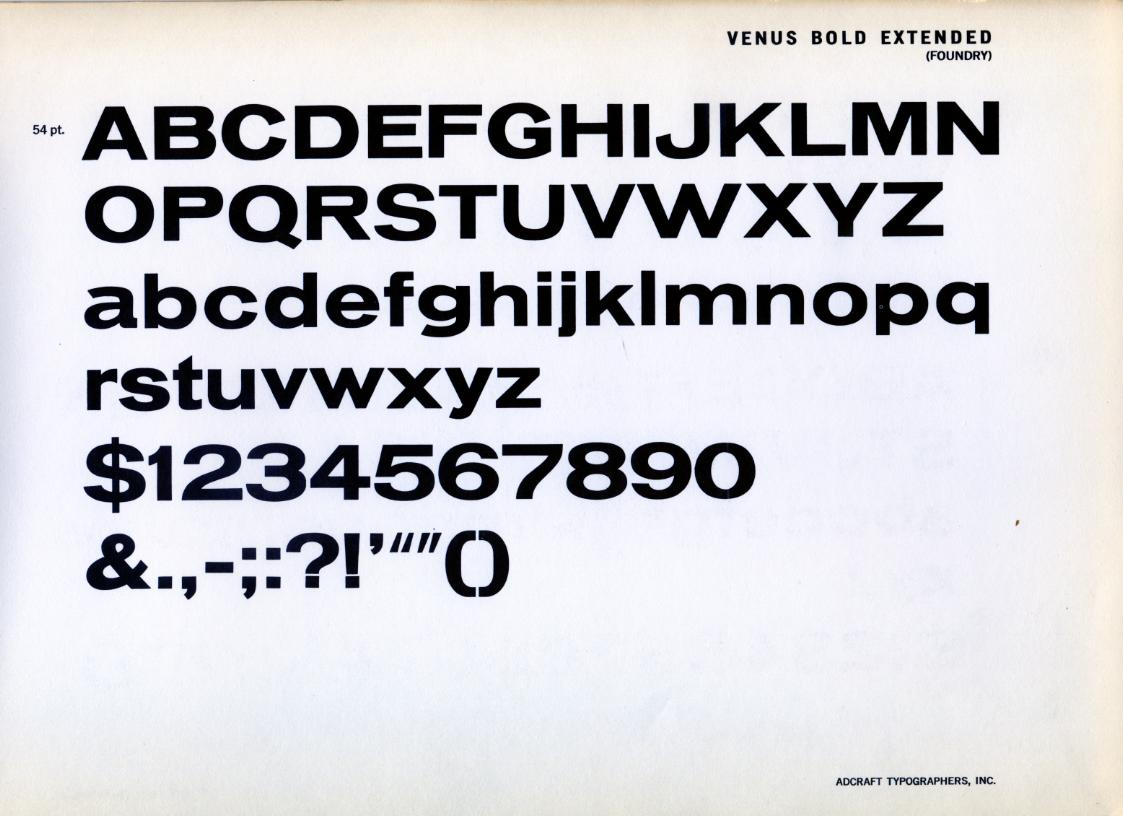
Venus Bold Extended

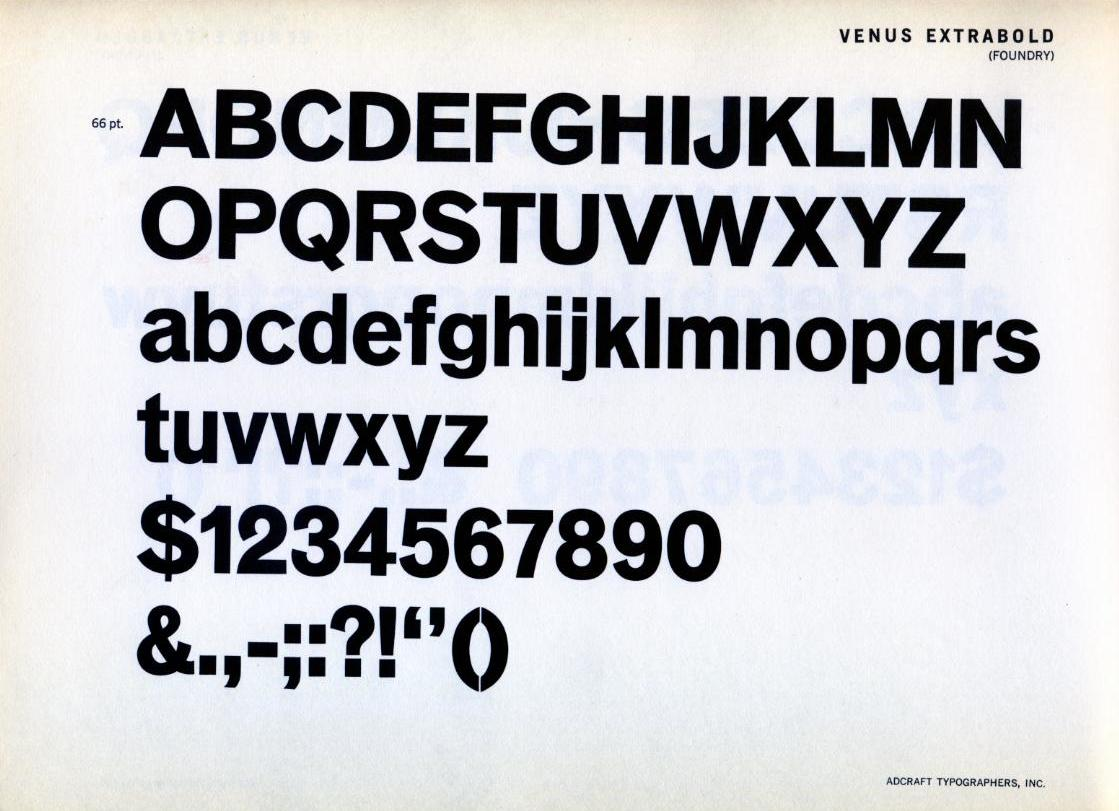
Venus Extra Bold

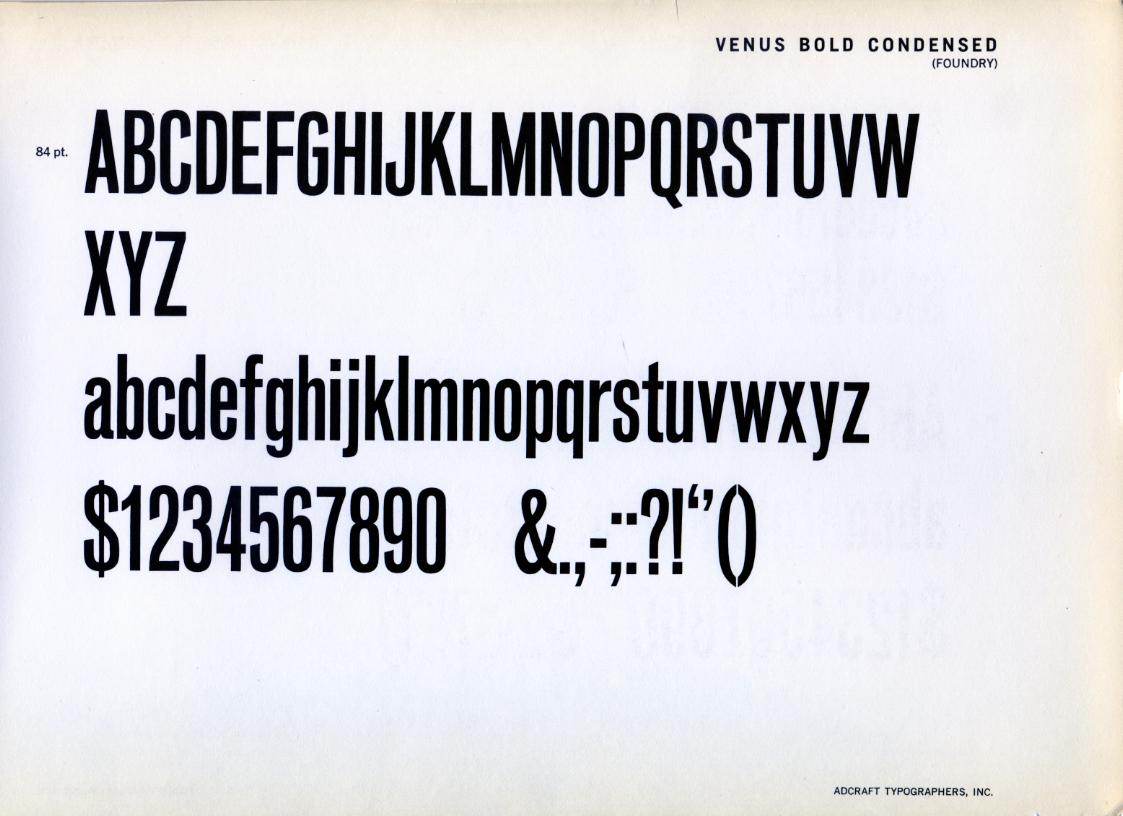
Venus Bold Condensed
