= Font substitution =

Used when the primary font is deficient

Font substitution is the process of using one typeface in place of another when the intended typeface either is not available or does not contain glyphs for the required characters.

Font substitution can be aided by:

- classifying fonts into generic font families, such that for example a sans serif font is substituted by another sans serif font.
- font substitutions defined in operating system's font configuration for concrete font names (font families), such that for example Arial font is substituted by metric-compatible font Liberation Sans or Nimbus Sans L.
- font substitutions defined in application software's (e.g. text processor) font configuration for concrete font names.

When font substitution is being used to find a replacement for an unavailable character, it can lead to inconsistent visual appearance as part of a word or sentence is displayed in one font and another part is displayed in the substituted font. A method to work around this problem is to display the entire word or paragraph in the substituted font. Nevertheless, font substitution may be critical to scripts not well supported by a large font inventory having the required Unicode range.

Examples of systems that perform font substitution include fontconfig, Adobe Reader, Unidrv, Microsoft Word (since Word 2002), Libre Office and OpenOffice.org. Not all systems that claim to offer font substitution are able to substitute for missing characters; some are only capable of substituting for missing fonts.

Major modern web browsers are capable of font substitution.

== See also ==
- Fallback font
- Web typography
