= Andy (typeface) =

Script typeface created in 1991

- Category: script
- Classification: Handwriting
- Designer(s): Steve Matteson
- Foundry: Monotype
- Date created: 1991
- Design based on: Mead Bold
- Also known as: Andy Std, Andy-Regular

The Andy typeface (originally known as Mead font and is also known as Patrick Hand) is a childish style design by Steve Matteson and owned by Monotype Imaging. This typeface family has a controlled spontaneity feature that combines informality and legibility needed for long documents with handwriting form.

The TrueType versions of this typeface have been tuned to be highly legible at low sizes, a quality level that is called ESQ ("Enhanced Screen Quality"), a term used by the foundry.

Andy Bold is a casual script based on the handwriting of Steve's friend Andy Mead. Its most notable use is as the main font of all text displayed in the 2011 video game Terraria. It is also used on the cartridges for the Pokémon video games and in the closing credits of Top of the Pops spin-off, TOTP2.
