= Curlz =

- Category: Display
- Designers: Carl Crossgrove and Steve Matteson
- Foundry: Monotype Corporation
- Date created: 1995
- Date released: 1995
- Characters: 239
- Glyphs: 246

Curlz MT is an OTF display typeface designed by Carl Crossgrove and Steve Matteson in 1995 for Agfa Monotype. It is distinct from other popular typefaces, characterized by its wavy strokes and swirls at the beginning or end of letters. Similar to Comic Sans and Papyrus, the font has garnered criticism from graphic designers for being used excessively in inappropriate ways. Curlz was designed as a casual, decorative typeface.

== TTF version ==
A TrueType version of Curlz shipped as part of the original Microsoft Project font set, and with Microsoft Office for Macintosh.

== Notes ==
One of the designers, Steve Matteson, has said that Curlz was not their proudest moment as a font designer.

== See also ==
- Samples of display typefaces
- Monotype
