= Victor Lardent =

British designer and draftsman (1905–1968)

Victor Lardent (1905–1968) was a British advertising designer and draftsman at The Times in London. In 1931, under the artistic direction of Stanley Morison, he created the typeface Times New Roman, which is commonly used in Microsoft Word.

== Career ==
Lardent worked as a draftsman in the publicity department of The Times newspaper. His specialism was creating lettering art for advertisers in The Times who did not have an advertising agency, and he was talented at drawing in pen and using an airbrush.

=== Times New Roman ===
Lardent's most famous project was designing the new typeface for The Times: once released as Times New Roman to the general market, it became one of the most popular typefaces of the twentieth century. Lardent did not have a detailed memory of his work on Times New Roman, although he spoke to Walter Tracy and James Moran about it in the 1960s.

The artistic director who commissioned and conceptualised the design was Stanley Morison, an influential writer on printing and artistic adviser to the typesetting machine manufacturer Monotype. Morison's biographer Nicolas Barker has described the different accounts of the design process as "puzzling and not a little hard to follow". Morison wrote that he created sketches for the typeface and gave them to Lardent, who created a finished design. Morison said that he chose to employ Lardent because of his ability to produce "an unusually firm and clear line". Morison remembered that he drew sketches of the design he wanted which Lardent expanded into a full type design.

Lardent told Moran that he thought he had been shown a photograph of a book printed by sixteenth-century printer Christophe Plantin; according to Moran "he was not sure about the exact book, but Plantin had remained in his mind". Moran felt that it was more likely a 1905 specimen from the Plantin-Moretus Museum, which holds Plantin's surviving materials and other types including the type by Robert Granjon that Times New Roman is loosely based on. Both Tracy and Barker endorsed this view, noting that the 'a' on Times New Roman is based on a replacement character added to the type in the 1730s.

Lardent's original drawings are according to Rhatigan lost, but photographs exist of his drawings. Rhatigan comments that Lardent's originals show "the spirit of the final type, but not the details." The design was adapted from Lardent's large drawings by the Monotype drawing office team in Salfords, Surrey, which worked out spacing and simplified some fine details.

James Moran's 1971 book Stanley Morison: His Typographic Achievement argued that Morison had exaggerated some aspects of his career in later life. He felt that "Morison could sketch a layout but was no draughtsman." Moran wrote that Lardent was embittered until his death at what he perceived to be a lack of proper recognition for his efforts in creating the font, but neither Barker nor Tracy remembered this speaking to him.

Lardent worked for Morison again later in his career on art for the books Splendour of Ornament, creating restorations of decorative patterns by Giovanni Antonio Tagliente, and Politics and Script. In the introduction to the former Morison praised Lardent's work for "inexhaustible patience and infinite skill".
