= Arial =

Sans-serif typeface

- Category: Sans-serif
- Classification: Neo-grotesque
- Designers: Robin Nicholas; Patricia Saunders
- Foundry: Monotype
- Date released: 1982
- License: Proprietary
- Design based on: Monotype Grotesque; Helvetica; Venus
- Variations: Arial Unicode MS
- Metrically compatible with: Arimo; Liberation Sans; Helvetica

Arial is a sans-serif typeface in the neo-grotesque style. Fonts from the Arial family are included with all versions of Microsoft Windows after Windows 3.1, as well as in other Microsoft programs, Apple's macOS, and many PostScript 3 printers. In Office 2007, Arial was replaced by Calibri as the default typeface in PowerPoint, Excel, and Outlook.

The typeface was designed in 1982 by Robin Nicholas and Patricia Saunders, for Monotype Typography. It is metrically compatible with Helvetica, enabling documents to use either typeface without affecting the visual layout. Because of their similar appearance, Arial and Helvetica are commonly mistaken for each other.

== Etymology ==
The name Arial was derived from the word aerial, introduced as a trademark by Monotype.

== Design characteristics ==
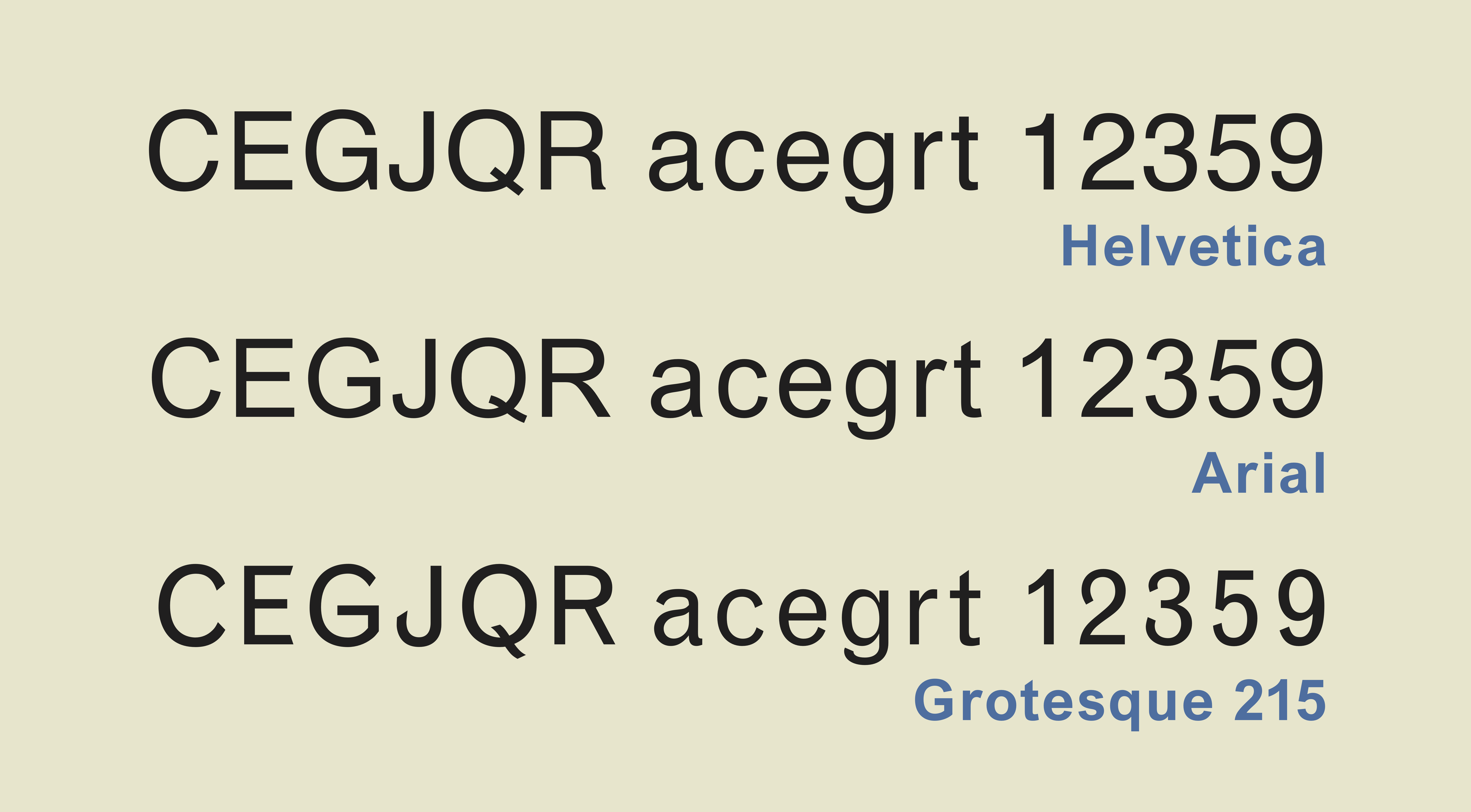
A comparison of Arial, Helvetica and Monotype Grotesque 215 scaled to equivalent cap height showing the most distinctive characters. Arial copies Helvetica's proportions and stroke width but has design detailing influenced by Grotesque 215.

Embedded in version 3.0 of the OpenType version of Arial is the following description of the typeface:

A contemporary sans serif design, Arial contains more humanist characteristics than many of its predecessors and as such is more in tune with the mood of the last decades of the twentieth century. The overall treatment of curves is softer and fuller than in most industrial style sans serif faces. Terminal strokes are cut on the diagonal which helps to give the face a less mechanical appearance. Arial is an extremely versatile family of typefaces which can be used with equal success for text setting in reports, presentations, magazines etc, and for display use in newspapers, advertising and promotions.

In 2005, Robin Nicholas said, "It was designed as a generic sans serif; almost a bland sans serif."

Arial is a neo-grotesque typeface: a design based on nineteenth-century sans-serifs, but regularized to be more suited to continuous body text and to form a cohesive font family.

Apart from the need to match the character widths and approximate/general appearance of Helvetica, the letter shapes of Arial are also strongly influenced by Monotype's own Monotype Grotesque designs—released in the 1920s or earlier Venus in the mid-1900s with additional influence from "New Grotesque"—an abortive redesign from 1956. The designs of the R, G and r also resemble Gill Sans. The changes cause the typeface to nearly match Linotype Helvetica in both proportion and weight (see figure), and perfectly match in width. Monotype executive Allan Haley observed, "Arial was drawn more rounded than Helvetica, the curves softer and fuller and the counters more open. The ends of the strokes on letters such as c, e, g and s, rather than being cut off on the horizontal, are terminated at the more natural angle in relation to the stroke direction." Matthew Carter, a consultant for IBM during its design process, described it as "a Helvetica clone, based ostensibly on their Grots 215 and 216".

The styling of Arabic glyphs comes from Times New Roman, which have more varied stroke widths than the Latin, Greek, Cyrillic glyphs found in the font. Arial Unicode MS uses monotone stroke widths on Arabic glyphs, similar to Tahoma.

The Cyrillic, Greek and Coptic Spacing Modifier Letters glyphs initially introduced in Arial Unicode MS, but later debuted in Arial version 5.00, have different appearances. One potential source of confusion in Arial is a visible homoglyph, a pair of easily confused characters: the lowercase letter L and the uppercase letter i (l and I) of the Latin script are effectively indistinguishable. This is also true of many other common fonts like Calibri, Open Sans, Segoe, Roboto and Helvetica.

== History ==
IBM debuted two printers for the in-office publishing market in 1982: the 240-DPI 3800-3 laserxerographic printer, and the 600-DPI 4250 electro-erosion laminate typesetter. Monotype was under contract to supply bitmap fonts for both printers. The fonts for the 4250, delivered to IBM in 1983, included Helvetica, which Monotype sub-licensed from Linotype. For the 3800–3, Monotype replaced Helvetica with Arial. The hand-drawn Arial artwork was completed in 1982 at Monotype by a 10-person team led by Robin Nicholas and Patricia Saunders, whose career is detailed in the Women in Type research project, and was digitized by Monotype at 240 DPI expressly for the 3800–3.

IBM named the font Sonoran Sans Serif due to licensing restrictions and the manufacturing facility's location (Tucson, Arizona, in the Sonoran Desert), and announced in early 1984 that the Sonoran Sans Serif family, "a functional equivalent of Monotype Arial", would be available for licensed use in the 3800-3 by the fourth quarter of 1984. There were initially 14 point sizes, ranging from 6 to 36, and four style/weight combinations (Roman medium, Roman bold, italic medium, and italic bold), for a total of 56 fonts in the family. Each contained 238 graphic characters, providing support for eleven national languages: Danish, Dutch, English, Finnish, French, German, Italian, Norwegian, Portuguese, Spanish, and Swedish. Monotype and IBM later expanded the family to include 300-DPI bitmaps and characters for additional languages.

In 1989, Monotype produced PostScript Type 1 outline versions of several Monotype fonts, but an official PostScript version of Arial was not available until 1991. In the meantime, a company called Birmy marketed a version of Arial in a Type 1-compatible format.

In 1990, Robin Nicholas, Patricia Saunders and Steve Matteson developed a TrueType outline version of Arial which was licensed to Microsoft.

In 1992, Microsoft chose Arial to be one of the four core TrueType fonts in Windows 3.1, announcing the font as an "alternative to Helvetica". Matthew Carter has noted that the deal was complex and included a bailout of Monotype, which was in financial difficulties, by Microsoft. Microsoft would later extensively fund the development of Arial as a font that supported many languages and scripts. Monotype employee Rod McDonald noted:

As to the widespread notion that Microsoft did not want to pay licensing fees [for Helvetica], [Monotype director] Allan Haley has publicly stated, more than once, that the amount of money Microsoft paid over the years for the development of Arial could finance a small country.

Arial ultimately became one of several fonts designed to be metrically compatible with PostScript standard fonts created by Monotype in collaboration with or sold to Microsoft around this time, including Century Gothic (metrically compatible with ITC Avant Garde), Book Antiqua (Palatino) and Bookman Old Style (ITC Bookman).

== Distribution ==
TrueType editions of Arial have shipped as part of Microsoft Windows since the introduction of Windows 3.1 in 1992; Arial was the default font.

From 1999 until 2016, Microsoft Office shipped with Arial Unicode MS, a version of Arial that includes many international characters from the Unicode standard. This version of the typeface was for a time the most widely distributed pan-Unicode font. The font was dropped from Microsoft Office 2016 and has been deprecated; continuing growth of the number of characters in Unicode and limitations on the number of characters in a font meant that Arial Unicode could no longer perform the job it was originally created for.

Arial MT, a PostScript version of the Arial font family, was distributed with Acrobat Reader 4 and 5.

PostScript does not require support for a specific set of fonts, but Arial and Helvetica are among the 40 or so typeface families that PostScript Level 3 devices typically support.

Mac OS X (now known as macOS) was the first Mac OS version to include Arial; it was not included in classic Mac OS. The operating system ships with Arial, Arial Black, Arial Narrow, and Arial Rounded MT. However, the default macOS font for sans-serif/Swiss generic font family is Helvetica. The bundling of Arial with Windows and macOS has contributed to it being one of the most widely distributed and used typefaces in the world.

In 1996, Microsoft launched the Core fonts for the Web project to make a standard pack of fonts for the Internet. Arial in TrueType format was included in this project. The project allowed anyone to download and install these fonts for their own use (on end user's computers) without any fee. The project was terminated by Microsoft in August 2002, allegedly due to frequent EULA violations. For MS Windows, the core fonts for the web were provided as self-extracting executables (.exe); each included an embedded cabinet file, which can be extracted with appropriate software. For the Macintosh, the files were provided as BinHexed StuffIt archives (.sit.hqx). The latest font version that was available from Core fonts for the Web was 2.82, published in 2000. Later versions (such as version 3 or version 5 which include many new characters) were not available from this project. A Microsoft spokesman declared in 2002 that members of the open-source community "will have to find different sources for updated fonts. ... Although the EULA did not restrict the fonts to just Windows and Mac OS, they were only ever available as Windows .exe's and Mac archive files." The chief technical officer of Opera Software cited the cancellation of the project as an example of Microsoft resisting interoperability.

== Arial variants ==
Sample text of Arial Black, a variant of Arial

Specimen of Arial Rounded

The known variants of Arial include:

- Arial: Sometimes called Arial Regular to distinguish its width from Arial Narrow, it contains Arial (Roman text weight), Arial Italic, Arial Bold, Arial Bold Italic
- Arial Unicode MS
- Arial Black: Arial Black, Arial Black Italic. This weight is known for being particularly heavy. This is because the face was originally drawn as a bitmap, and to increase the weight, stroke widths for bold went from a single pixel width to two pixels in width. It only supports Latin, Greek and Cyrillic.
- Arial Narrow: Arial Narrow Regular, Arial Narrow Bold, Arial Narrow Italic, Arial Narrow Bold Italic. This family is a condensed version.
- Arial Rounded: Arial Rounded Light, Arial Rounded Regular, Arial Rounded Medium, Arial Rounded Bold, Arial Rounded Extra Bold. The regular versions of the rounded glyphs can be found in Gulim, Microsoft's Korean font set. Originally only available in bold form as Arial Rounded MT Bold, extra fonts appeared as retail products. In Linotype's retail version, only Arial Rounded Regular supports WGL character set.
- Arial Special: Arial Special G1, Arial Special G2. They are included with Microsoft Encarta Virtual Globe 99, Expedia Streets and Trips 2000, MapPoint 2000.
- Arial Light, Arial Medium, Arial Extra Bold, Arial Light Condensed, Arial Condensed, Arial Medium Condensed, Arial Bold Condensed: These fonts first appeared in the Linotype online stores. The condensed fonts do not have italic counterparts.
- Arial Monospaced: In this monospaced variant, letters such as @, I (uppercase i), i, j, l (lowercase L), M, W are redesigned.

=== Arial Alternative ===
Arial Alternative Regular and Arial Alternative Symbol are standard fonts in Windows ME, and can also be found on Windows 95 and Windows XP installation discs, and on Microsoft's site. Both fonts are Symbol-encoded. These fonts emulate the monospaced font used in Minitel/Prestel teletext systems, but vectorized with Arial styling. These fonts are used by HyperTerminal.

Arial Alternative Regular contains only ASCII characters, while Arial Alternative Symbol contains only 2 × 3 semigraphics characters.

=== Code page variants ===
Arial Baltic, Arial CE, Arial Cyr, Arial Greek, Arial Tur are aliases created in the FontSubstitutes section of WIN.INI by Windows. These entries all point to the master font. When an alias font is specified, the font's character map contains different character set from the master font and the other alias fonts.

In addition, Monotype also sells Arial in reduced character sets, such as Arial CE, Arial WGL, Arial Cyrillic, Arial Greek, Arial Hebrew, Arial Thai.

Arial Unicode is a version supporting all characters assigned with Unicode 2.1 code points.

=== Arial Nova ===
Arial Nova is based on the original 1982 design, called Sonoran Sans by IBM. The common versions of Arial had diverged from Sonora Sans over the years, while Arial Nova is designed to return to the original shapes, character spacing, and proportions.

Arial Nova is available on Windows 10 and up as part of the "Pan-European Supplemental Fonts" optional feature, and is also offered free of charge on Microsoft Store. It contains Regular, Bold and Light weights, corresponding italics and corresponding Condensed widths. This version supports Cyrillic, Greek, and Turkish characters.

=== ABC Areal ===
Areal is a custom typeface designed for Are.na by Dinamo Typefaces, an independent type design studio based in Berlin, founded in 2013 by Johannes Breyer and Fabian Harb. Developed through a year-long collaboration, it replaced Arial in 2026, which the platform had used for nearly 15 years, and was introduced across Are.na, including its editorial section. Described by its designers as a “revival” of Arial, Areal is based on version 2.82, which they identify as the first version of Arial used on the internet. The typeface was entirely redrawn and rebuilt to suit Are.na’s needs.

Unlike typeface revivals based on printed materials such as books, posters, or record covers, Areal draws on digital source material. The designers describe the project as an exploration of Arial’s early history through software developed for hardware that has since become obsolete. Areal is free to download.

== Monotype/Linotype retail versions ==
=== Arial ===
The TrueType core Arial fonts (Arial, Arial Bold, Arial Italic, Arial Bold Italic) support the same character sets as the version 2.76 fonts found in Internet Explorer 5/6, Windows 98/ME.

Version sold by Linotype includes Arial Rounded, Arial Monospaced, Arial Condensed, Arial Central European, Arial Central European Narrow, Arial Cyrillic, Arial Cyrillic Narrow, Arial Dual Greek, Arial Dual Greek Narrow, Arial SF, Arial Turkish, Arial Turkish Narrow.

In addition, Monotype also sells Arial in reduced character sets, such as Arial CE, Arial WGL, Arial Cyrillic, Arial Greek, Arial Hebrew, Arial Thai, Arial SF.

=== Arial WGL ===
It is a version that covers only the Windows Glyph List 4 (WGL4) characters. They are only sold in TrueType format.

The family includes Arial (regular, bold, italics), Arial Black, Arial Narrow (regular, bold, italics), Arial Rounded (regular, bold).

=== Ascender Corporation fonts ===
Ascender Corporation sells the font in Arial WGL family, as well as the Arial Unicode.

== Arial in other font families ==
Arial glyphs are also used in fonts developed for non-Latin environments, including Arabic Transparent, BrowalliaUPC, Cordia New, CordiaUPC, Miriam, Miriam Transparent, Monotype Hei, and Simplified Arabic.

== Free alternatives ==
Arial is a proprietary typeface to which Monotype Imaging owns all rights, including software copyright and trademark rights (under U.S. copyright law, Monotype cannot legally copyright the shapes of the actual glyphs themselves). Its licensing terms prohibit derivative works and free redistribution.

There are some free software metric-compatible fonts used as free Arial alternatives or used for Arial font substitution:

- Liberation Sans is a metrically equivalent font to Arial developed by Ascender Corp. and published by Red Hat in 2007, initially under the GPL license with some exceptions. Versions 2.00.0 onwards are published under SIL Open Font License. It is used in some Linux distributions as default font replacement for Arial. Liberation Sans Narrow is a metrically equivalent font to Arial Narrow contributed to Liberation fonts by Oracle in 2010, but is not included in 2.00.0. Google commissioned a variation named Arimo for ChromeOS.
- URW++ produced a version of Helvetica called Nimbus Sans L in 1987, and it was eventually released under the GPL and AFPL (as Type 1 font for Ghostscript) in 1996. It is one of the Ghostscript fonts, free alternatives to 35 basic PostScript fonts (which include Helvetica).
- FreeSans, a free font descending from URW++ Nimbus Sans L, which in turn descends from Helvetica. It is one of free fonts developed in GNU FreeFont project, first published in 2002. It is used in some free software as Arial replacement or for Arial font substitution.
- TeX Gyre Heros, a free font descending from URW++ Nimbus Sans L, which in turn descends from Helvetica. It is one of free fonts developed by the Polish TeX Users Group (GUST), first published in 2007. It is licensed under the GUST Font License.

== See also ==
- Core fonts for the Web
- List of typefaces
- Category:Monotype typefaces – typefaces owned by or designed for Monotype Imaging
- Roboto
