= Simon Loxley =

British graphic designer and bestselling author

Simon Loxley is a British graphic designer and bestselling author.

== Life ==
He was born and raised in London.

== Career ==
He has worked for the National Portrait Gallery, Museum of London, the Geffrye Museum, the Maritime Museum, the London Library, and the Dulwich Picture Gallery.

He is a founding editor of Ultrabold magazine.

== Bibliography ==
Some of his books are:

- Type: The Secret History of Letters
- Type is Beautiful: The Story of Fifty Remarkable Fonts
- Printer's Devil: The Life and Work of Frederic Warde
- La historia secreta de las letras
- Believe Me, I Am: Selected Letters of Frederic Warde
- Emery Walker: Arts, craft, and a world in motion
