= Ascender Corporation =

Digital typeface foundry

- Company type: Subsidiary
- Industry: Graphic design
- Genre: Typeface design
- Founded: 2004; 22 years ago
- Founder: Steve Matteson
- Defunct: 2010
- Fate: Acquired by Monotype Imaging
- Headquarters: Elk Grove Village, Illinois, United States
- Products: Droid, Liberation fonts

Ascender Corporation was a digital typeface foundry and software development company in the Chicago suburb of Elk Grove Village, Illinois. It was founded in 2004 by a team of software developers, typographers, and people previously involved in developing fonts used widely in computers, inkjet printers, phones, and other digital technology devices. On December 8, 2010, Ascender Corp. was acquired by Monotype Imaging.

The company marketed both directly to consumers with font packs and individual fonts, and to original equipment manufacturers and software developers with custom font design and implementation. The company also extended font glyphs for international use and "hinted" (whereby characters are optimized for screen viewing).

== Subsidiaries ==
Webtype.com was a joint venture by The Font Bureau and Ascender Corporation, announced on August 17, 2010 as a new venture to serve web designers and developers with fonts to improve the typography and readability of websites.

== Type designers ==
Steve Matteson, one of Ascender’s founding partners and lead type designer, worked on the Arial and Times New Roman typefaces that Microsoft Corporation introduced in Windows 3.1 in 1992 and have distributed in all subsequent versions of Microsoft Windows and recent versions of Mac OS. Since then Matteson has designed other fonts including Segoe, Microsoft’s current corporate branding font, Convection for the Xbox 360, and the Liberation fonts for Red Hat’s Linux Distribution. Some of Matteson’s other font designs include Andalé Mono, Andy, Curlz, and Endurance.

Another founding partner of Ascender, Tom Rickner, specializes in the technical nuances of digital typography, the production of non-Latin scripts and TrueType font hinting. Rickner oversaw the development of the first TrueType fonts delivered in Apple Computer’s System 7 in 1991. Most recently he was involved in the development of Microsoft's ClearType font collection. He has also been involved in the design and production of many typefaces created for the digital environment including Georgia, Graphite, Meiryo, Nina, Tahoma, Tekton, and Verdana.

== Products ==
In the year that Ascender was formed, it released its first typeface, Endurance, with the goal of high readability both in print and on screen. Its design follows the Swiss model of grotesque sans serifs. Capital letters are less constricted in proportion than other popular grotesques (Arial and Helvetica for instance). Terminals are shorter and counters are generally more open. The italics are designed and not algorithmically slanted.

In 2005, Ascender announced that it agreed with Microsoft Corporation to distribute Microsoft fonts, including the Windows Core Fonts, the Microsoft Web Fonts and the many multilingual fonts currently supplied by Microsoft in its software products and operating systems.

In that same year Ascender announced that it had a distribution agreement with IBM to provide a range of Japanese fonts as well as a distribution agreement with Bigelow & Holmes Type Foundry to distribute the Lucida family of fonts.

Also in 2005, Steve Matteson designed the fonts for the Xbox 360 video game and entertainment system from Microsoft. Ascender's type designers and font software engineers created custom fonts tuned specifically for high-quality display on-screen in the Xbox user interface, as well as multilingual fonts to support the Xbox 360 branding and marketing around the world.

At the end of 2005 Ascender announced its first OpenType Pro font, Pericles Pro. Pericles Pro is based on the work of Robert Foster who created the original designs for American Type Founders in 1934. Each Pericles Pro font includes 433 glyphs. This includes 12 stylistic alternates and 17 ligatures to mix and match with a full set of capitals, small capitals, superscript, subscript, and small capital letters.

In 2006 Ascender released numerous products for hardware and software developers including a font set that meets the EIA-708-B standard for Digital TV Closed Captioning (DTVCC), large Unicode compliant fonts and fonts for HD DVD authors and publishers designed to enhance the on-screen experience that is part of an HD DVD's Advanced Content.

Also in 2006 Ascender introduced a software product for mobile phones – the Ascender Personality Kit, which combined ring tones, wallpaper backgrounds, themes, and fonts into packaged sets that automated the process of acquiring and applying multiple components for users to personalize their Windows Mobile phone.

In November, 2007 Ascender announced it had created the Droid font family for the Android handset platform.

In 2007 Ascender executed a license to distribute the Microsoft scalable font engine that supports hinting technology to enhance on-screen legibility. Ascender also created the Liberation fonts distributed by Red Hat. In the same year Ascender made the Microsoft ClearType Font Collection available to end users looking to utilize the fonts from the Microsoft Vista operating system on other platforms (including Mac, Unix and previous Windows versions).

== Research ==
Ascender conducted numerous typographic-related research projects including a study on the typefaces that appear on the front pages of America's top daily newspapers. This study identified the most popular typefaces, sources, and the pervasive use of custom fonts in newspaper design.

Another Ascender study researched the free and shareware fonts that can be found on the most-popular Websites. The study analyzed more than 4500 TrueType fonts that could be downloaded by Macintosh, Windows, and Linux users to determine their viability for use in linking downloadable fonts to web pages as part of the Cascading Style Sheets (CSS) specification proposed by the W3C. The study found that out of the 4572 fonts tested, 4385 (95.9%) failed one or more of six tests.

== See also ==
- Monotype Corporation
- Droid fonts
- Liberation fonts
