= Liberation fonts =

Open-source font superfamily

Liberation Sans
- Liberation Sans
- Category: Sans-serif
- Classification: Neo-grotesque
- Designer: Steve Matteson
- Foundry: Ascender Corporation
- License: SIL Open Font License (version 2 onwards); GPL font exception (older versions)
- Variations: Arimo
- Metrically compatible with: Arial Helvetica

Liberation Serif
- Category: Serif
- Classification: Transitional
- Foundry: Ascender Corporation
- License: SIL Open Font License (version 2 onwards); GPL font exception (older versions)
- Variations: Tinos
- Metrically compatible with: Times New Roman Times

Liberation Serif is metrically identical to Times New Roman. However, designer Steve Matteson's letterforms differ considerably, being less rounded and more squared.

Liberation is the collective name of four TrueType font families: Liberation Sans, Liberation Sans Narrow, Liberation Serif, and Liberation Mono. These fonts are metrically compatible with the most popular fonts on the Microsoft Windows operating system and the Microsoft Office software package (Monotype Corporation's Arial, Arial Narrow, Times New Roman and Courier New, respectively), for which Liberation is intended as a free substitute. The fonts are default in LibreOffice.

== Characteristics ==
Liberation Sans, Sans Narrow, Serif and Mono closely match the metrics of Monotype Corporation fonts Arial, Arial Narrow, Times New Roman and Courier New (Note: Liberation Mono is styled closer to Liberation Sans than to Courier New) respectively. This means that the characters of each Liberation font are identical in width and height to those of each corresponding Monotype font. It allows the Liberation fonts to serve as free, open-source replacements of the proprietary Monotype fonts without changing the document layout.

Comparison of initial release of Liberation fonts to the fonts with which they are designed to be metrically compatible

Comparison of Liberation Sans with Arial

Comparison of Liberation Serif with Times New Roman

Comparison of Liberation Mono with Courier New

== Unicode coverage ==
All three fonts supported IBM/Microsoft code pages 437, 737, 775, 850, 852, 855, 857, 858, 860, 861, 863, 865, 866, 869, 1250, 1251, 1252, 1253, 1254, 1257, the Macintosh Character Set (US Roman), and the Windows OEM character set, that is, the Latin, Greek, and Cyrillic alphabets, leaving out many writing systems. Extension to other writing systems was prevented by its unique licensing terms. Since the old fonts were replaced by the Croscore equivalents, expanded Unicode coverage has become possible.

== History ==
The fonts were developed by Steve Matteson of Ascender Corporation as Ascender Sans and Ascender Serif. A variant of this font family, with the addition of a monospaced font and open-source license, was licensed by Red Hat Inc. as the Liberation font family. Liberation Sans and Liberation Serif derive from Ascender Sans and Ascender Serif respectively; Liberation Mono uses base designs from Ascender Sans and Ascender Uni Duo.

The fonts were developed in two stages. The first release of May 2007 was a set of fully usable fonts, but they lacked the full hinting capability. The second release, available in early 2008, provides full font hinting.

In April 2010, Oracle Corporation contributed the Liberation Sans Narrow typefaces to the project. They are metrically compatible with the popular Arial Narrow font family. With Liberation Fonts 1.06 the new typefaces were officially released.

== Distribution ==
=== Version 2.00.0 or above ===
As of December 2018, Liberation Fonts 2.00.0 and above are a fork of the ChromeOS Fonts released under the SIL Open Font License, and all fonts are developed at GitHub.

=== Older versions ===
Red Hat licensed these fonts from Ascender Corp under the GNU General Public License with a font embedding exception, which states that documents embedding these fonts do not automatically fall under the GNU GPL. As a further exception, any distribution of the object code of the Software in a physical product must include the right to access and modify the source code of the Software and to reinstall the modified version of the Software in object code form on the same physical product on which it was received. Thus, these fonts permit free and open-source software (FOSS) systems to have high-quality fonts that are metric-compatible with Microsoft software.

The Fedora Project, as of version 9, was the first major Linux distribution to include these fonts by default and features a slightly revised versions of the Liberation fonts contributed by Ascender. These include a dotted zero and various changes made for the benefit of internationalization.

Some other Linux distributions (such as Ubuntu, OpenSUSE and Mandriva Linux) included Liberation fonts in their default installations. The open source software LibreOffice, OpenOffice.org and Collabora Online included Liberation fonts in their installation packages for all supported operating systems.

Due to licensing concerns with fonts released under a GPL license, some projects looked for alternatives to the Liberation fonts. Starting with Apache OpenOffice 3.4, Liberation Fonts were replaced with the ChromeOS Fonts – also known as Croscore fonts: Arimo (sans), Cousine (monospace), and Tinos (serif) – which are made available by Ascender Corporation under the Apache License 2.0.

== Unsupported features ==
Unlike modern versions of Times New Roman, Arial, and Courier New, Liberation fonts do not support OpenType advanced typography features like ligatures, old style numerals, or fractions.

== See also ==
Typefaces

- Croscore fonts – Chrome OS core fonts
- Droid – a font family by the same font designer
- Gentium – an Open Font License font which defines roughly 1,500 glyphs covering almost all the range of Latin characters used worldwide
- Linux Libertine – another free software serif typeface with OpenType features support
- Nimbus Roman No. 9 L, Nimbus Sans L and Nimbus Mono L – another series of free software fonts also designed to be substituted for Times New Roman, Arial and Courier.
- GNU FreeFont, derived from Nimbus, but with a better Unicode support.

Other

- Open-source Unicode typefaces
