= List of sans serif typefaces =

This list of sans-serif typefaces details standard sans-serif fonts used in classical typesetting and printing.

== List of samples ==
Samples of sans-serif typefaces
| Typeface name | Example 1 | Example 2 | Example 3 |
|---|---|---|---|
| Agency FB Designer: Caleigh Huber & Morris Fuller Benton Class: Geometric | | | |
| Akzidenz-Grotesk Designer: Günter Gerhard Lange Class: Grotesque | | | |
| Amplitude Designer: Christian Schwartz Class: Humanist | —N/a | —N/a | |
| Andalé Sans Designer: Steve Matteson Class: Humanist | —N/a | —N/a | |
| Antique Olive Designer: Roger Excoffon Class: Humanist | | | |
| Aptos Designer: Steve Matteson Class: Neo-grotesque | —N/a | —N/a | |
| Archivo Designer: Héctor Gatti, Omnibus Type Class: Grotesque | | | |
| Arial Designer: Robin Nicholas & Patrica Saunders Class: Neo-grotesque | | | |
| Arimo | —N/a | —N/a | |
| Austria Class: Geometric | —N/a | —N/a | |
| ITC Avant Garde Gothic Designer: Herb Lubalin, Tom Carnase Class: Geometric | | | |
| Avenir Designer: Adrian Frutiger Class: Geometric | | | |
| Bahnschrift Designer: Microsoft Class: Geometric | | | |
| Bank Gothic Designer: Morris Fuller Benton Class: Geometric | | | |
| Bell Centennial Designer: Matthew Carter Class: Humanist | | | |
| Bell Gothic Designer: Chauncey H. Griffith Class: Grotesque | | | |
| Benguiat Gothic Designer: Ed Benguiat Class: Humanist | | | |
| Bobcaygeon Designer: Brian Kent(designer) Class: Geometric | | | |
| Breeze Sans Designer: Dalton Maag, Fontrix Class: Humanist | —N/a | —N/a | |
| Calibri Designer: Lucas de Groot Class: Humanist | | | |
| Candara Designer: Gary Munch Class: Humanist | | | |
| Cantarell Designer: Dave Crossland Class: Humanist | | | |
| Caractères Class: Grotesque | —N/a | —N/a | |
| Century Gothic Class: Geometric | | | |
| Charcoal (Mac OS 9 system font) Designer: David Berlow | | | |
| Chicago (pre-Mac OS 9 system font, still included with Mac OS X) Designer: Susan Kare | | | |
| Adobe Clean - Adobe's now standard GUI and icon font Class: Humanist, Spurless | | —N/a | |
| Clear Sans (Intel) Designer: Dan Rhatigan, George Ryan, Robin Nicholas | | | |
| Clearview Designer: James Montalbano et al. Class: Humanist | | | —N/a |
| Comic Neue Designer: Craig Rozynski, Hrant Papazian | | | |
| Comic Sans Designer: Vincent Connare | | | |
| Consolas Designer: Luc(as) de Groot Class: Humanist | | | |
| Corbel Designer: Jeremy Tankard Class: Humanist | | | |
| FF Dax Designer: Hans Reichel Class: Humanist, Spurless | | | |
| DejaVu Sans Class: Humanist | | | |
| DIN 1451 Designer: Deutsches Institut für Normung Class: Grotesque, Geometric | | | |
| Drogowskaz Designer: Marek Sigmund Class: Geometric | | | |
| Droid Sans Designer: Steve Matteson Class: Humanist | | | |
| Dubai Designer: Nadine Chahine (chief designer) Class: Humanist, Semi-spurless | | | |
| Eras Designer: Albert Boton, Albert Hollenstein Class: Humanist | | | |
| Eurostile Designer: Aldo Novarese, Akira Kobayashi Class: Geometric | | | |
| e-Ukraine Designer: Dmytro Rastvortsev Class: Neo-grotesque | —N/a | —N/a | |
| Fira Sans Designer: Erik Spiekermann, Ralph du Carrois Class: Humanist | | | |
| Folio Designer: Konrad Bauer & Walter Baum Class: Neo-grotesque | —N/a | —N/a | |
| Franklin Gothic Designer: Morris Fuller Benton Class: Grotesque | | | |
| Frutiger Designer: Adrian Frutiger Class: Humanist | | | |
| FS Albert Designer: Jason Smith, Mitja Miklavčič Class: Humanist | —N/a | —N/a | —N/a |
| Futura Designer: Paul Renner Class: Geometric | | | |
| Geneva Designer: Susan Kare Class: Grotesque | | | |
| Gerstner Programm Designer: Karl Gerstner Class: Neo-grotesque | —N/a | —N/a | |
| Gill Sans Designer: Eric Gill Class: Humanist | | | |
| Gotham Designer: Tobias Frere-Jones Class: Geometric | | | |
| Grand Slang Designer: Nikolas Wrobel Class: Calligraphic | | | |
| Gridnik Designer: Wim Crouwel Class: Geometric | —N/a | —N/a | |
| Haettenschweiler Designer: Walter Haettenschweiler Class: Grotesque | | | |
| Handel Gothic Designer: Don Handel, Ronald Trogram Class: Geometric, Spurless | | | |
| HarmonyOS Sans Designer: Huawei Class: Geometric | | —N/a | |
| Helvetica Designer: Max Miedinger, Eduard Hoffman Class: Neo-grotesque | | | |
| Highway Gothic Designer: Ted Forbes Class: Neo-grotesque | | | |
| IBM Plex Sans Designer: Mike Abbink Class: Grotesque | | | |
| Impact Designer: Geoffrey Lee Class: Grotesque | | | |
| Inter Designer: Rasmus Andersson Class: Neo-grotesque | | | |
| Interstate Designer: Tobias Frere-Jones Class: Mixed | | | |
| GE Inspira Designer: Mike Abbink Class: Geometric | | | |
| Johnston Designer: Edward Johnston, Eric Gill Class: Humanist | | | |
| Kabel Designer: Rudolf Koch Class: Geometric | | | |
| Karrik Designer: Jean-Baptiste Morizot, Lucas Le Bihan Class: Grotesque | | | |
| Klavika Designer: Eric Olson Class: Humanist, Geometric | | | —N/a |
| Lato Designer: Łukasz Dziedzic Class: Humanist | | | |
| Liberation Sans Designer: Steve Matteson Class: Grotesque | | | —N/a |
| LilyUPC | —N/a | —N/a | —N/a |
| Libre Franklin Designer: Impallari Type | —N/a | —N/a | |
| Linux Biolinum Designer: Philipp Poll | —N/a | —N/a | |
| Lucida Grande (former Mac OS X system font, used from Mac OS X 10.0 to Mac OS X 10.9) Designer: Charles Bigelow, Kris Holmes Class: Humanist | | —N/a | |
| Lucida Sans Designer: Charles Bigelow, Kris Holmes Class: Humanist | | | |
| FS Me Designer: Jason Smith Class: Humanist | —N/a | —N/a | |
| FF Meta Designer: Erik Spiekermann Class: Humanist | | | |
| Microsoft Sans Serif Designer: Microsoft Class: Neo-grotesque | | | |
| Montserrat Designer: Julieta Ulanovsky, Sol Matas, Juan Pablo del Peral, and Jacques Le Bailly Class: geometric | | —N/a | |
| Myriad Designer: Robert Slimbach, Carol Twombly Class: Humanist | | | |
| National Trust Designer: Paul Barnes Class: Humanist | —N/a | —N/a | |
| News Gothic Designer: Morris Fuller Benton Class: Grotesque | | | |
| Neuzeit S Designer: Arthur Ritzel Class: Geometric, Grotesque | —N/a | —N/a | |
| Nokia Pure Designer: Dalton Maag, Vincent Connare Class: Neo-grotesque | —N/a | | —N/a |
| Noto Sans Designer: Google Class: Humanist | | | |
| Nunito Sans Designer: Vernon Adams (type designer) Class: Neo-grotesque | —N/a | —N/a | —N/a |
| OCR-B Designer: Adrian Frutiger Class: Neo-grotesque | | | |
| Open Sans Designer: Steve Matteson Class: Humanist | | | |
| Optima Designer: Hermann Zapf Class: Humanist | | | |
| Overpass Designer: Delve Witherington Class: Mixed | | | |
| Oxygen Designer: Vernon Adams (type designer) | | | —N/a |
| Proxima Nova Designer: Mark Simonson Class: Geometric-grotesque | | | |
| Radis Sans Designer: Gaël Goy Class: Geometric | | | —N/a |
| Rail Alphabet Designer: Margaret Calvert, Jock Kinneir Class: Neo-grotesque | —N/a | —N/a | |
| Raleway Designer: Matt McInerney Class: Geometric | —N/a | —N/a | —N/a |
| Roboto Designer: Christian Robertson Class: Neo-grotesque | | | |
| San Francisco Class: Neo-grotesque | | | —N/a |
| FF Scala Sans Designer: Martin Majoor Class: Humanist | —N/a | —N/a | |
| Segoe UI (2003-2011) Designer: Steve Matteson Class: Humanist | | | —N/a |
| Segoe UI (2012-present) Designer: Steve Matteson Class: Humanist | —N/a | —N/a | |
| Selawik Designer: Microsoft Class: Humanist | | | |
| Semplicità Designer: Nebiolo Class: Geometric, spurless | —N/a | —N/a | |
| Seravek Designer: Eric Olson Class: Humanist | —N/a | —N/a | |
| Skia Designer: Matthew Carter Class: Humanist, Spurless | | | |
| OnePlus Slate Designer: Rod McDonald (typographer) Class: Humanist | | | |
| SNV Designer: Association of Swiss Road Traffic Experts Class: Geometric, Neo-grotesque | —N/a | —N/a | |
| Solare Designer: Nikolas Wrobel Class: Grotesque | | | |
| Source Sans Pro Designer: Paul D. Hunt Class: Grotesque | | | |
| Sweden Sans Class: Geometric | | | |
| Syntax Designer: Hans Eduard Meier Class: Humanist | —N/a | | |
| Tahoma Designer: Matthew Carter Class: Humanist | | | |
| Thesis Sans Designer: Lucas de Groot Class: Humanist | | —N/a | |
| Tiresias Designer: RNIB Class: Humanist | | | |
| Trade Gothic Designer: Jackson Burke Class: Grotesque | | | |
| Transport Designer: Jock Kinneir, Margaret Calvert Class: Mixed | —N/a | | |
| Tratex Designer: Karl-Gustav Gustafson Class: Geometric | —N/a | | |
| Trebuchet MS Designer: Vincent Connare Class: Humanist | | | |
| Twentieth Century Designer: Sol Hess Class: Geometric | —N/a | —N/a | |
| Ubuntu Designer: Dalton Maag Class: Humanist, Spurless | | | |
| Unica Designer: Team ’77 (André Gürtler, Christian Mengelt and Erich Gschwind) Class: Neo-grotesque | —N/a | —N/a | |
| Univers Designer: Adrian Frutiger Class: Neo-grotesque | | | |
| Universalis Designer: Arkandis Class: Geometric | | | |
| VAG Rounded Designer: Gerry Barney et al. Class: Geometric | | | |
| Vera Sans Designer: Jim Lyles Class: Humanist | | | |
| Vercetti Regular Designer: Filippos Fragkogiannis, Richard Mandona Class: Humanist, Geometric | | | |
| Verdana Designer: Matthew Carter Class: Humanist | | | |
| Whitney Designer: Tobias Frere-Jones Class: Humanist | —N/a | —N/a | |

== Additional sans-serif typefaces ==
- Acumin
- Akkurat
- Andika
- APHont
- Architype Albers
- Architype Bayer
- Architype Renner
- Architype Schwitters
- Architype van der Leck
- Architype Van Doesburg
- Arial Unicode MS
- Atkinson Hyperlegible
- Barlow
- Bauhaus
- Benton Sans
- Berlin Sans
- Bernhard Gothic
- Berthold Block
- Bliss
- Braggadocio
- Brandon Grotesque
- Britannic
- Brusseline
- Carretera Convencional
- Carter Sans
- Caslon Egyptian
- Charlotte Sans
- Compacta
- Computer Modern Sans
- Coolvetica
- Cronos
- Dotum
- Dyslexie
- Eagle
- Ecofont
- Encode Sans
- Erbar
- Espy Sans
- Esseltub
- Euphemia
- Eurocrat
- FE-Schrift
- FF Clan
- FF DIN
- FF Kievit
- Founders Grotesk
- Gautami
- Gibson (typeface)
- Gilroy
- Goudy Sans
- Granby
- Graphik
- Greycliff
- Grotesque
- Hobo
- HyperFont
- Ilica
- Industria
- IrisUPC
- ITC Kahana
- Lithos
- LLM Lettering
- Lucida Sans Unicode
- Lydian
- Malgun Gothic
- Mandatory
- Manoptica
- Meiryo
- Metro
- Microgramma
- Microsoft YaHei
- Modern (vector font included with Windows 3.1)
- Monotype Grotesque
- Motorway
- Neo Sans
- Network
- Neutraface
- Neuzeit S
- New Gulim
- Nimbus Sans
- Nirmala UI
- Nobel
- Nordstern
- Normal-Grotesk
- NR Brunel
- OpenDyslexic
- Panno
- Parisine
- Passata
- Permanent Headline
- Phosphate
- Podium Sans
- Polish road signs typeface
- Product Sans
- Radiant
- Red Circle
- Retina
- Romulus Sans
- Rotis Sans
- Sassoon
- Sherbrooke
- Source Han Sans
- Spartan
- Spline Sans
- Squarish Sans CT
- SST
- Stereofidelic
- Stroudley
- System
- Tasse
- Template Gothic
- Tempo
- Tern
- Tilson
- Toronto Subway
- Trafikkalfabetet
- Triplex
- Twentieth Century
- Ubuntu Titling
- Umbra
- URW Grotesk
- Venus
- Zurich

== See also ==
- Fixedsys
- List of display typefaces
- List of monospaced typefaces
- List of script typefaces
- List of serif typefaces
