= List of typefaces included with Microsoft Windows =

This is a list of typefaces shipped with Windows 3.1x through to Windows 11. Typefaces only shipped with Microsoft Office or other Microsoft applications are not included. The "Included from" column indicates the first edition of Windows in which the font was included.

== Included typefaces with versions ==
Typeface	Family	Spacing	Weights/Styles	Target script	Included from	Can be installed on	Example image
Aharoni	Sans Serif	Proportional	Bold	Hebrew, Latin		XP, Vista	
Aldhabi	Serif	Proportional	Regular	Arabic	8	Vista, 7	
Andalus		Proportional	Regular	Arabic			
Angsana New		Proportional	Regular, Bold, Italic, Bold Italic	Thai			
AngsanaUPC		Proportional	Regular, Bold, Italic, Bold Italic	Thai			
Aparajita			Regular, Bold, Italic, Bold Italic	Devanagari	7	XP, Vista	
Arabic Typesetting		Proportional	Regular	Arabic	Vista		
Arial	Sans Serif	Proportional	Regular, Bold, Italic, Bold Italic, Black	Latin, Greek, Cyrillic, Arabic, Hebrew	3.1, 98 (Black)		
Bahnschrift	Sans Serif	Proportional	Light, Semilight, Regular, Semibold, Bold; intermediate weights (variable font)	Latin	10 (v1709)	7, 8, 8.1, 10 (RTM-v1703)	
Batang			Regular	Korean		NT 4.0, 98, 2000, ME	
BatangChe			Regular	Korean			
BIZ UDGothic, BIZ UDPGothic			Regular, Bold	Japanese	10 (v1809)		
BIZ UDMincho, BIZ UDPMincho			Medium	Japanese	10 (v1809)		
Book Antiqua			Regular, Bold, Italic, Bold Italic	Latin, Greek, Cyrillic	98	3.1, 95, NT 4.0	
Browallia New			Regular, Bold, Italic, Bold Italic	Thai			
BrowalliaUPC			Regular, Bold, Italic, Bold Italic	Thai			
Calibri	Sans Serif	Proportional	Light, Light Italic, Regular, Bold, Italic, Bold Italic	Latin, Greek, Cyrillic, Hebrew, Vietnamese (Windows 8), Arabic (Windows 10), Armenian (Windows 10)	Vista, 8 (Light)	Regular: 2000, XP; Light: Vista, 7	
Calisto MT	Serif	Proportional	Regular, Bold, Italic, Bold Italic	Latin, Greek, Cyrillic	98	3.1, 95, NT 4.0	
Cambria	Serif	Proportional	Regular, Bold, Italic, Bold Italic	Latin, Greek, Cyrillic	Vista	2000, XP	
Cambria Math	Serif	Proportional	Regular	Math	Vista	2000, XP	
Candara	Sans Serif	Proportional	Light, Light Italic, Regular, Bold, Italic, Bold Italic	Latin, Greek, Cyrillic	Vista, 10 v1809 (Light)	2000, XP	
Cascadia Code	Preformatted (Serif and Sans Serif)	Monospace	ExtraLight, ExtraLight Italic, Light, Light Italic, SemiLight, SemiLight Italic, Regular, Bold, Italic, Bold Italic, SemiBold, SemiBold Italic	Latin, Greek, Cyrillic	11	10	
Century Gothic	Sans Serif	Proportional	Regular, Bold, Italic, Bold Italic	Latin, Greek, Cyrillic	98	3.1, 95, NT 4.0	
Comic Sans MS	Sans Serif, Script	Proportional	Regular, Bold, Italic, Bold Italic	Latin, Greek, Cyrillic	95 (OSR1), 8 (Italic)	3.1	
Consolas	Preformatted (Serif and Sans Serif)	Monospace	Regular, Bold, Italic, Bold Italic	Latin, Greek, Cyrillic	Vista	2000, XP	
Constantia	Serif	Proportional	Regular, Bold, Italic, Bold Italic	Latin, Greek, Cyrillic	Vista	2000, XP	
Copperplate Gothic	Display	Proportional	Light, Bold	Latin, Greek, Cyrillic	98	3.1, 95, NT 4.0	
Corbel	Sans Serif	Proportional	Regular, Italic, Bold, Bold Italic	Latin, Greek, Cyrillic	Vista	2000, XP	
Cordia New			Regular, Bold, Italic, Bold Italic	Thai			
CordiaUPC			Regular, Bold, Italic, Bold Italic	Thai			
Courier New	Serif	Monospace	Regular, Bold, Italic, Bold Italic	Latin, Greek, Cyrillic, Arabic, Hebrew	3.1		
DaunPenh			Regular	Khmer	Vista	2000, XP	
David	Serif	Proportional	Regular, Bold	Hebrew, Latin			
DengXian			Light, Regular, Bold	Simplified Chinese	10		
DilleniaUPC			Regular, Italic, Bold, Bold Italic	Thai			
DFKai-SB	Serif	Proportional	Regular	Traditional Chinese	Vista		
DokChampa			Regular	Lao	Vista		
Dotum	Sans Serif	Proportional	Regular	Korean	2000		
DotumChe	Sans Serif	Monospace	Regular	Korean	2000		
Ebrima	Sans Serif	Proportional	Regular, Bold	N'Ko, Tifinagh, Vai	7	XP, Vista	
Estrangelo Edessa			Regular	Syriac	XP		
EucrosiaUPC			Regular, Italic, Bold, Bold Italic	Thai			
Euphemia			Regular	Unified Canadian Aboriginal Syllabics	Vista		
FangSong			Regular	Simplified Chinese	Vista		
Franklin Gothic	Sans Serif	Proportional	Medium, Medium Italic	Latin, Greek, Cyrillic	XP	NT 4.0, 98, 2000, ME	
FrankRuehl			Regular	Hebrew			
FreesiaUPC			Regular, Bold, Italic, Bold Italic	Thai			
Gabriola	Serif, Script	Proportional	Regular	Latin, Greek, Cyrillic	7	XP, Vista	
Gadugi	Sans Serif	Proportional	Regular, Bold	Cherokee, Unified Canadian Aboriginal Syllabics	8	Vista, 7	
Gautami	Sans Serif	Proportional	Regular, Bold	Telugu	XP	NT 4.0, 98, 2000, ME	
Georgia	Serif	Proportional	Regular, Bold, Italic, Bold Italic	Latin, Greek, Cyrillic	2000	95, NT 4.0, 98	
Gisha	Sans Serif	Proportional	Regular, Bold	Hebrew	Vista		
Gulim	Sans Serif	Proportional	Regular	Korean	2000		
GulimChe	Sans Serif	Monospace	Regular	Korean	2000		
Gungsuh	Serif	Proportional	Regular	Korean			
GungsuhChe	Serif	Proportional	Regular	Korean			
HoloLens MDL2 Assets	Serif	Proportional	Regular		10		
Impact	Display	Proportional	Regular	Latin, Greek, Cyrillic	98	95, NT 4.0	
Ink Free	Display	Proportional	Regular	Latin	10 (v1803)	7, 8, 8.1, 10 (RTM-v1709)	
IrisUPC	Sans Serif	Proportional	Regular, Bold, Italic, Bold Italic	Thai			
Iskoola Pota			Regular, Bold	Sinhala	Vista		
JasmineUPC			Regular, Bold, Bold Italic, Italic	Thai			
Javanese Text			Regular	Javanese	8.1	Vista, 7, 8	
KaiTi (SimKai)			Regular	Simplified Chinese	Vista	XP, Vista	
Kalinga			Regular, Bold	Odia	Vista		
Kartika			Regular, Bold	Malayalam	XP (SP2)		
Khmer UI			Regular, Bold	Khmer	7	XP, Vista	
KodchiangUPC			Regular, Bold, Italic, Bold Italic	Thai			
Kokila			Regular, Bold, Italic, Bold Italic	Devanagari	7	XP, Vista	
Lao UI			Regular, Bold	Lao	7	XP, Vista	
Latha			Regular, Bold	Tamil	XP	NT 4.0, 98, 2000, ME	
Leelawadee			Regular, Bold	Thai	Vista		
Leelawadee UI			Regular, Bold, Semilight	Buginese, Thai, Javanese, Khmer, Lao	8.1	Vista, 7, 8	
Levenim MT			Regular, Bold	Hebrew			
LilyUPC			Regular, Bold, Italic, Bold Italic	Thai			
Lucida Console	Preformatted (Serif and Sans Serif)	Monospace	Regular	Latin, Greek, Cyrillic	98	3.1, 95, NT 4.0	
Lucida Handwriting	Script	Proportional	Regular	Latin, Greek, Cyrillic	98	3.1, 95, NT 4.0	
Lucida Sans Unicode	Sans Serif	Proportional	Regular	Latin, Greek, Cyrillic, Hebrew	98	3.1, 95, NT 4.0	
Magneto			Regular, Italic, Bold, Bold Italic		XP		File:Magneto font.svg
Malgun Gothic	Sans Serif	Proportional	Regular, Bold, Semilight	Korean (no Hanja before Windows 8)	Vista, 10 (Semilight)	2000, XP	
Mangal			Regular, Bold	Devanagari	2000		
Marlett	Serif	Proportional	Regular	Windows Interface	95	3.1	
Meiryo, Meiryo UI			Regular, Italic, Bold, Bold Italic	Japanese	Vista, 7 (UI)		
Microsoft Himalaya			Regular	Tibetan	Vista	2000, XP	
Microsoft JhengHei	Sans Serif	Proportional	Light, Regular, Bold	Traditional Chinese	Vista	2000, XP	
Microsoft JhengHei UI			Light, Regular, Bold	Traditional Chinese	8	Vista, 7	
Microsoft New Tai Lue			Regular, Bold	New Tai Lue	7	XP, Vista	
Microsoft PhagsPa			Regular, Bold	'Phags-pa	7	XP, Vista	
Microsoft Sans Serif	Sans Serif	Proportional	Regular	Latin, Greek, Cyrillic, Arabic, Hebrew, Thai	95		
Microsoft Tai Le			Regular, Bold	Tai Le	7	XP, Vista	
Microsoft Uighur			Regular, Bold	Uighur	Vista, 8 (Bold)		
Microsoft YaHei	Sans Serif	Proportional	Light, Regular, Bold	Simplified Chinese	Vista	2000, XP	
Microsoft YaHei UI			Light, Regular, Bold	Simplified Chinese	8	Vista, 7	
Microsoft Yi Baiti			Regular	Yi	Vista		
MingLiU, PMingLiU	Serif	Monospaced, Proportional		Traditional Chinese			
MingLiU-ExtB, PMingLiU-ExtB		Monospaced, Proportional		Traditional Chinese	Vista		
MingLiU_HKSCS		Monospaced		Cantonese	Vista		
MingLiU_HKSCS-ExtB		Monospaced		Cantonese	Vista		
Miriam		Proportional		Hebrew			
Miriam Fixed		Monospaced		Hebrew			
Mongolian Baiti			Regular	Mongolian, Manchu, Xibo	Vista	2000, XP	
MoolBoran			Regular	Khmer	Vista		
MS Gothic	Sans Serif	Monospace	Regular	Japanese			
MS PGothic	Sans Serif	Proportional	Regular	Japanese			
MS Mincho	Serif	Monospace	Regular	Japanese			
MS PMincho	Serif	Proportional	Regular	Japanese			
MS UI Gothic	Sans Serif	Proportional	Regular	Japanese			
MV Boli		Proportional	Regular	Thaana	XP		
Myanmar Text			Regular, Bold	Myanmar	8	Vista, 7	
Narkisim	Serif	Proportional	Regular	Hebrew			
News Gothic MT	Sans Serif	Proportional	Regular, Bold, Italic	Latin	98		
Nirmala UI			Regular, Bold	Devanagari, Bengali, Gurmukhi, Gujarati, Odia, Tamil, Telugu, Kannada, Malayalam, Sinhala	8	Vista, 7	
Noto Sans HK	Sans Serif	Proportional	Thin, Light, DemiLight, Regular, Medium, Bold, Black	Cantonese	10, 11		
Noto Serif HK	Serif	Proportional	Thin, Light, DemiLight, Regular, Medium, Bold, Black	Cantonese	10, 11		
Noto Sans JP	Sans Serif	Proportional	Thin, Light, DemiLight, Regular, Medium, Bold, Black	Japanese	10, 11		
Noto Serif JP	Serif	Proportional	Thin, Light, DemiLight, Regular, Medium, Bold, Black	Japanese	10, 11		
Noto Sans KR	Sans Serif	Proportional	Thin, Light, DemiLight, Regular, Medium, Bold, Black	Korean	10, 11		
Noto Serif KR	Serif	Proportional	Thin, Light, DemiLight, Regular, Medium, Bold, Black	Korean	10, 11		
Noto Sans SC	Sans Serif	Proportional	Thin, Light, DemiLight, Regular, Medium, Bold, Black	Simplified Chinese	10, 11		
Noto Serif SC	Serif	Proportional	Thin, Light, DemiLight, Regular, Medium, Bold, Black	Simplified Chinese	10, 11		
Noto Sans TC	Sans Serif	Proportional	Thin, Light, DemiLight, Regular, Medium, Bold, Black	Traditional Chinese	10, 11		
Noto Serif TC	Serif	Proportional	Thin, Light, DemiLight, Regular, Medium, Bold, Black	Traditional Chinese	10, 11		
NSimSun	Serif	Monospace	Regular	Simplified Chinese			
Nyala			Regular	Ethiopic	Vista	2000, XP	
Palatino Linotype	Serif	Proportional	Regular, Bold, Italic, Bold Italic	Latin, Greek, Cyrillic	2000	95, NT 4.0, 98	
Plantagenet Cherokee			Regular	Cherokee	Vista		
Raavi			Regular, Bold	Gurmukhi	XP	NT 4.0, 98, 2000, ME	
Rod	Serif	Monospace	Regular	Hebrew			
Sakkal Majalla	Serif	Proportional	Regular, Bold	Arabic	7	XP, Vista	
Sanskrit Text			Regular	Devanagari	10	7, 8, 8.1	
Segoe MDL2 Assets			Regular		10		
Segoe Print	Display, Script, Sans Serif	Proportional	Regular, Bold	Latin, Greek, Cyrillic	Vista	2000, XP	
Segoe Script	Display, Script, Sans Serif	Proportional	Regular, Bold	Latin, Greek, Cyrillic	Vista	2000, XP	
Segoe UI	Sans Serif	Proportional	Light, Light Italic, SemiLight, SemiLight Italic, Regular, Italic, SemiBold, SemiBold Italic, Bold, Bold Italic, Black, Black Italic	Latin, Greek, Cyrillic, Armenian, Hebrew, Arabic, Georgian, Lisu	8	Vista, 7	
Segoe UI Emoji	Sans Serif	Proportional	Regular	Emoji, emoticons and symbols	8.1	Vista, 7, 8	
Segoe UI Historic	Sans Serif	Proportional	Regular, Bold	Latin, Greek, Cyrillic, Brahmi	10	7, 8, 8.1	
Segoe UI Symbol	Sans Serif	Proportional	Regular	Latin, Greek, Cyrillic	7	XP, Vista	
Segoe UI Variable	Sans Serif	Proportional	Small Light, Small SemiLight, Small Regular, Small Semibold, Small Bold, Display Light, Display SemiLight, Display Regular, Display Semibold, Display Bold, Text Light, Text SemiLight, Text Regular, Text Semibold, Text Bold	Latin, Greek, Cyrillic	11	10	
Segoe Fluent Icons	Symbols		Regular	Symbols	11	10	
Shonar Bangla			Regular, Bold	Bengali	7	XP, Vista	
Shruti			Regular, Bold	Gujarati	XP	NT 4.0, 98, 2000, ME	
SimHei	Sans Serif	Monospace	Regular	Simplified Chinese			
Simplified Arabic		Proportional	Regular, Bold	Arabic			
SimSun	Serif	Monospace	Regular	Simplified Chinese			
SimSun-ExtB	Serif	Monospace	Regular	Simplified Chinese	Vista		
SimSun-ExtG	Serif	Monospace	Regular	Simplified Chinese	10, 11		
Sitka Banner	Serif	Proportional	Regular, Italic, Bold, Bold Italic	Latin, Greek, Cyrillic	8.1	Vista, 7, 8	
Sitka Display	Serif	Proportional	Regular, Bold, Italic, Bold Italic	Latin, Greek, Cyrillic	8.1	Vista, 7, 8	
Sitka Heading	Serif	Proportional	Regular, Bold, Italic, Bold Italic	Latin, Greek, Cyrillic	8.1	Vista, 7, 8	
Sitka Small	Serif	Proportional	Regular, Bold, Italic, Bold Italic	Latin, Greek, Cyrillic	8.1	Vista, 7, 8	
Sitka Subheading	Serif	Proportional	Regular, Bold, Italic, Bold Italic	Latin, Greek, Cyrillic	8.1	Vista, 7, 8	
Sitka Text	Serif	Proportional	Regular, Italic, Bold, Bold Italic	Latin, Greek, Cyrillic	8.1	Vista, 7, 8	
Sylfaen	Serif	Proportional	Regular	Armenian, Georgian	2000	95, NT 4.0, 98	
Symbol	Symbolic	Proportional	Regular		3.1		
Tahoma	Sans Serif	Proportional	Regular, Bold	Latin, Greek, Cyrillic, Arabic, Hebrew, Thai	95	3.1	
Times New Roman	Serif	Proportional	Regular, Bold, Italic, Bold Italic	Latin, Greek, Cyrillic, Arabic, Hebrew, Armenian	3.1		
Traditional Arabic	Serif	Proportional	Regular, Bold	Arabic	2000	95, NT 4.0, 98	
Trebuchet MS	Sans Serif	Proportional	Regular, Bold, Bold Italic, Italic	Latin, Greek, Cyrillic	2000	95, NT 4.0, 98	
Tunga	Sans Serif	Proportional	Regular, Bold	Kannada	XP	NT 4.0, 98, 2000, ME	
UD Digi Kyokasho N-R	Sans Serif	Monospace	Regular	Japanese	10 (v1709)		
UD Digi Kyokasho N-B	Sans Serif	Monospace	Bold	Japanese	10 (v1709)		
UD Digi Kyokasho NK-R	Sans Serif	Proportional	Regular	Japanese	10 (v1709)		
UD Digi Kyokasho NK-B	Sans Serif	Proportional	Bold	Japanese	10 (v1709)		
UD Digi Kyokasho NP-R	Sans Serif	Proportional	Regular	Japanese	10 (v1709)		
UD Digi Kyokasho NP-B	Sans Serif	Proportional	Bold	Japanese	10 (v1709)		
Urdu Typesetting	Serif	Proportional	Regular	Arabic	8		
Utsaah	Sans Serif	Proportional	Regular, Bold, Italic, Bold Italic	Devanagari	7		
Vani	Serif	Proportional	Regular, Bold	Telugu	7		
Verdana	Sans Serif	Proportional	Regular, Bold, Italic, Bold Italic	Latin, Greek, Cyrillic, Vietnamese, Armenian	95	3.1	
Vijaya	Display, Script	Proportional	Regular, Bold	Tamil	7		
Vrinda	Sans Serif	Proportional	Regular, Bold	Bengali	XP (SP2)	NT 4.0, 98, 2000, ME	
Webdings	Symbolic	Proportional	Regular		98	3.1, 95, NT 4.0	
Wingdings	Symbolic	Proportional	Regular	Symbols	3.1		
Yu Gothic	Sans Serif	Proportional	Regular, Bold, Light, Medium	Japanese	8.1	Vista, 7, 8	
Yu Gothic UI	Sans Serif	Proportional	Regular, Bold, Light, Semilight, Semibold	Japanese	10	Vista, 7, 8	
Yu Mincho	Serif	Proportional	Regular, Demibold, Light	Japanese	8.1	Vista, 7, 8	

== See also ==
- Core fonts for the Web
- List of typefaces
- List of typefaces included with macOS
- Unicode font
