= Vercetti =

Vercetti may refer to:

- Lucas Vercetti, part of the American hip hop collective Odd Future or OFWGKTA (Odd Future Wolf Gang Kill Them All)
- Tommy Vercetti, a fictional character, the protagonist and playable character in the 2002 video game Grand Theft Auto: Vice City
- Vercetti Regular, a sans-serif font released in 2022, free for commercial use
