= Calibri =

Humanist sans-serif typeface family

- Category: Sans-serif
- Classification: Humanist
- Designers: Lucas de Groot (Standard Latin, Cyrillic, Greek, and Hebrew); Mamoun Sakkal (Arabic); Ruben Tarumian (Armenian and Georgian)
- Foundry: Microsoft
- Date created: 2002–2005
- Date released: 2006; 20 years ago
- License: Proprietary
- Metrically compatible with: Carlito

Calibri (/kə.ˈliːb.ri/, kə-LEEB-ree) is a digital sans-serif typeface family in the humanist or modern style. It was designed by Lucas de Groot in 2002–2004 and released to the general public in 2007, with Windows Vista. In Microsoft Office 2007, it replaced Times New Roman as the default font in Word and replaced Arial as the default font in PowerPoint, Excel, and Outlook. In Windows 7, it replaced Arial as the default font in WordPad. De Groot described its subtly rounded design as having "a warm and soft character". In January 2024, the font was replaced by Microsoft's new bespoke font, Aptos, as the new default Microsoft Office font, after 17 years.

Calibri is part of the ClearType Font Collection, a suite of fonts from various designers released with Windows Vista. All start with the letter C to reflect that they were designed to work well with Microsoft's ClearType text rendering system, a text rendering engine designed to make text clearer to read on liquid-crystal display monitors. The other fonts in the same group are Cambria, Candara, Consolas, Constantia and Corbel.

== Characteristics ==
Calibri features subtly rounded stems and corners that are visible at larger sizes. Its sloped form is a "true italic" with handwriting influences, which are seen in many modern sans-serif typefaces.

The typeface includes characters from Latin, Latin extended, Greek, Cyrillic and Hebrew scripts. Calibri makes extensive use of sophisticated OpenType formatting; it features a range of ligatures as well as lining and text figures, indices (numbers enclosed by circles) up to 20, and an alternative f and g (shown in sample) accessible by enabling the fourth and fifth stylistic sets. Some features in Calibri remain unsupported by Office, including true small caps, all-caps spacing, superscript and subscript glyphs and the ability to create arbitrary fractions; these may be accessed using programs such as Adobe InDesign.

One potential source of confusion in Calibri is a visible homoglyph, a pair of easily confused characters: the lowercase letter L and the uppercase letter i (l and I) of the Latin script are effectively indistinguishable. This is also true of many other common fonts, like Arial, Open Sans, Segoe and Helvetica.

The design has similarities to de Groot's much more extensive TheSans family (a humanist font) and shares similarities with humanist fonts, although TheSans has straight ends rather than rounding.

De Groot has also said in 2016 that he would like if possible to add Bulgarian alphabet variant letterforms at a later date.

== Availability ==
A comparison between Calibri and Carlito in some of the more different glyphs

Calibri was the default typeface of Microsoft Office and much other Microsoft software, replacing the previously used Times New Roman.

Because of the long development of Windows Vista, Calibri's development – from 2002 to 2005 – occurred several years before the release of that OS. It was first presented in a 2005 beta of Windows Vista, then codenamed Longhorn, and first became available for use with the Beta 2 version of Office 2007, released on 23 May 2006. Calibri and the rest of the ClearType Font Collection were finally released to the general public on 30 January 2007, since when it has been released with most Microsoft software environments.

Calibri is also distributed with Excel Viewer, PowerPoint Viewer, the Microsoft Office Compatibility Pack for Windows, and the Open XML File Format Converter for Mac. For use in other operating systems and web apps, a license may be obtained from LucasFonts or Ascender Corporation and its parent company Monotype Imaging.

The Calibri Light font was introduced in Windows 8, and was retrospectively added to Windows 7 as part of a software update. In Microsoft Office 2013, Calibri Light is the default font for PowerPoint presentations and Word headings.

In 2013, Google released a freely-licensed font called Carlito, which is metric-compatible to Calibri, as part of ChromeOS. Carlito's metric-compatibility ensures ChromeOS users can correctly display and print a document designed in Calibri without disrupting its layout. Carlito's glyph shapes are based on the prior open-source typeface Lato.

On 13 July 2023, Microsoft announced that they would switch the default Microsoft 365 font from Calibri to their new font, Aptos.

== Awards ==
Calibri won the TDC2 2005 award from the Type Directors Club under the Type System category. The Arabic typeface of Calibri won the 2nd Award of GRANSHAN 2016.

== In crime and politics ==
Because Calibri was the default font in Microsoft Office from 2007 to 2023, several cases have been reported in which documents presented in Calibri were shown to be forged thanks to a purported creation date before 2006, when Calibri was made available to the general public:

- In 2017, the font came to public attention as evidence in the Pakistani government-related "Panama Papers" case (also known as Fontgate), in which a document provided by Maryam Nawaz (daughter of ex-PM Nawaz Sharif) supposedly signed in February 2006 was found to be typed out in Calibri. Inventor De Groot said that there was "really zero chance" that the document was genuine.
- In 2009, a letter attributed to Bob Hayes, an American footballer and sprinter who died in 2002, was found to be a forgery as it was typed out in Calibri.
- In 2012, the Turkish government charged approximately 300 people with conspiracy to commit a coup. The incriminating evidence was a document alleged to have been written in 2003. The document, however, was written in Calibri, which was not available in 2003.
- In 2017, Gerald McGoey, former CEO of Look Communications, filed for personal bankruptcy. He produced documents ostensibly showing he had transferred parts of his estate to be held in trust for his children. One of the documents, which had a date of 2004, was typed out in Calibri.
- In 2023, probate judge Sandra A. Harrison of Macomb County dismissed a man's claims against his parents for breach of contract and unjust enrichment after the defense counsel discovered that a business record, purported to have been signed on 13 December 2000, was typed out in Calibri.

== Official government use ==
In January 2023, the United States Department of State retired Times New Roman in favor of Calibri for official communications and documents due to superior readability on a computer screen, and accessibility, since its sans-serif nature would cause fewer problems in the usage of text-to-speech and optical character recognition tools. In December 2025, the State Department switched back to using Times New Roman. In an internal memorandum, secretary of state Marco Rubio stated the change was intended to "restore decorum and professionalism to the department's written work" and "abolish yet another wasteful DEIA program".
