= Andrew Rosenheim =

British-American writer and novelist

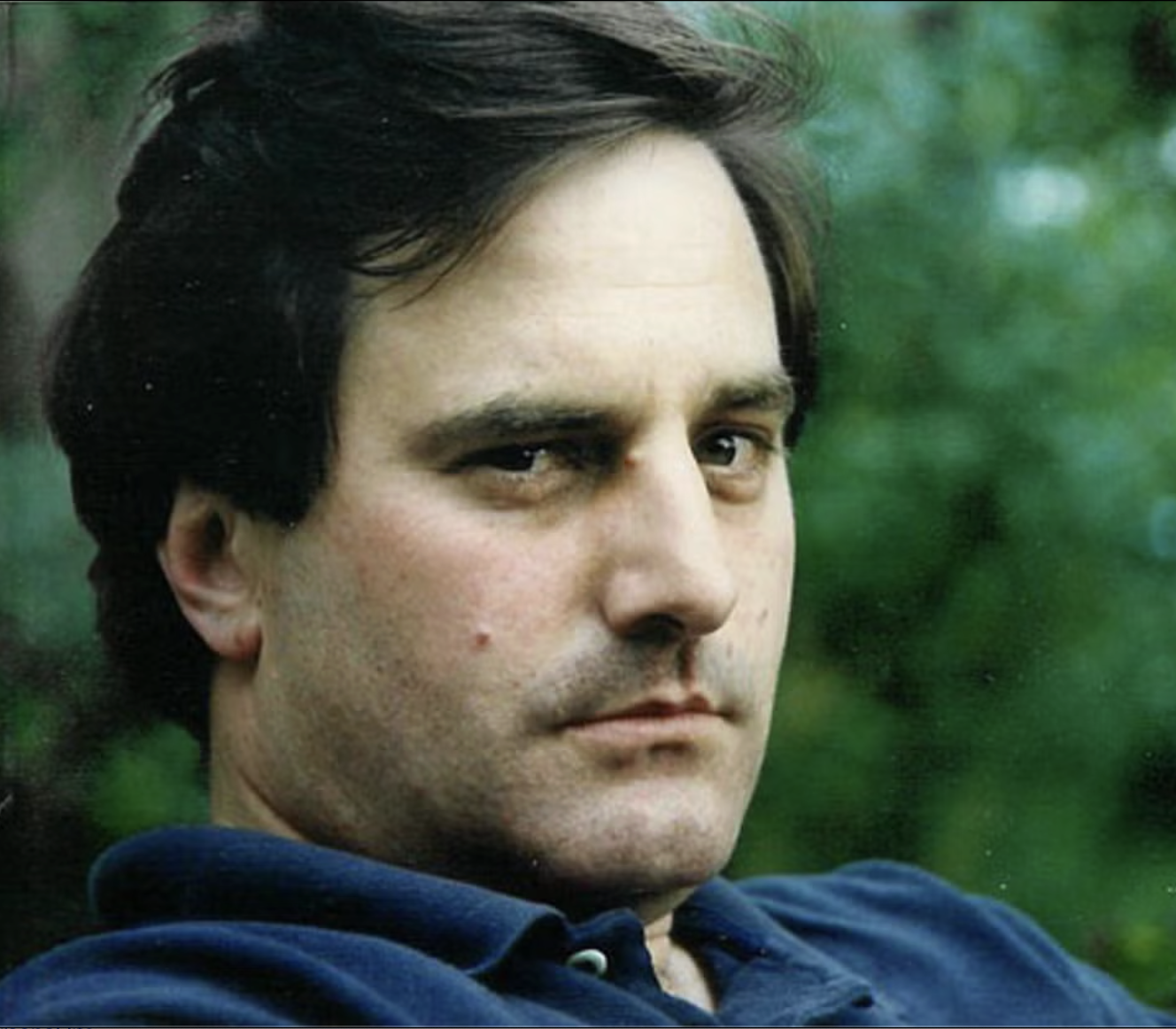
- Born: August 23, 1955 (age 71); Chicago, Illinois, United States
- Education: Yale University; University of Oxford (MLitt)
- Occupation: Novelist
- Website: andrewrosenheim.com

Andrew Rosenheim (born August 23, 1955) is an American novelist, critic and publisher living in Britain. He is the author of ten novels and a memoir, and is best known for his literary thrillers exploring politics and espionage.

== Early life and education ==
Rosenheim was born and raised on the South Side of Chicago. He graduated from Yale University in English Literature, then came to the UK in 1977 as a Rhodes Scholar. As a student at Pembroke College, Oxford, he completed a degree in philosophy, politics and economics, and an Master of Letters in English. He lives near Oxford.

== Career ==
In the 1980s, Rosenheim worked on early electronic publishing projects in the United States with Dick Brass, before joining Wang Laboratories in the United Kingdom, where he became involved in artificial intelligence and language-research projects. His second novel, Hands On (1993) was the first novel to explore AI-generated poetry.

From 1990, Rosenheim was Director of Electronic Publishing at Oxford University Press, spearheading the digital release of the Oxford English Dictionary on CD-ROM. He left to join Penguin Press as Managing Director in 1997, where he expanded the number of titles published under the Allen Lane imprint.

Following his involvement in the Ladbroke Grove rail crash, Rosenheim left Penguin in 2001 to write full-time.

In 2012, Rosenheim joined Amazon.com as the UK editor of Kindle Singles, the retailer's effort to sell fiction and nonfiction for its e-reader device. In 2018, Rosenheim moved to Audible Inc. as senior editor of Audible Original Publishing. He left Audible in 2019 to focus on writing full-time once more.

== Bibliography ==
=== Nessheim Trilogy ===
Historical espionage thriller series set in 1930s and 1940s America.

- Fear Itself (Hutchinson, 2011)
- The Informant (Hutchinson, 2013)
- The Little Tokyo Informant (Overlook, 2013)
- The Accidental Agent (Hutchinson, 2016)

=== Other Novels ===
- The Tormenting of Lafayette Jackson (David R. Godine, 1988)
- Hands On (Heinemann: Mandarin, 1993)
- Stillriver (Hutchinson, 2004)
- Keeping Secrets (Hutchinson, 2006)
- Without Prejudice (Hutchinson, 2008)
- Holly Lester (Bloomsbury Reader, 2016)
- The Interpreter's Secret (No Exit Press, 2026)

=== Memoir ===
- The Secrets of Carriage H (Kindle Single, 2014)
