= Jeremy Tankard =

British type designer

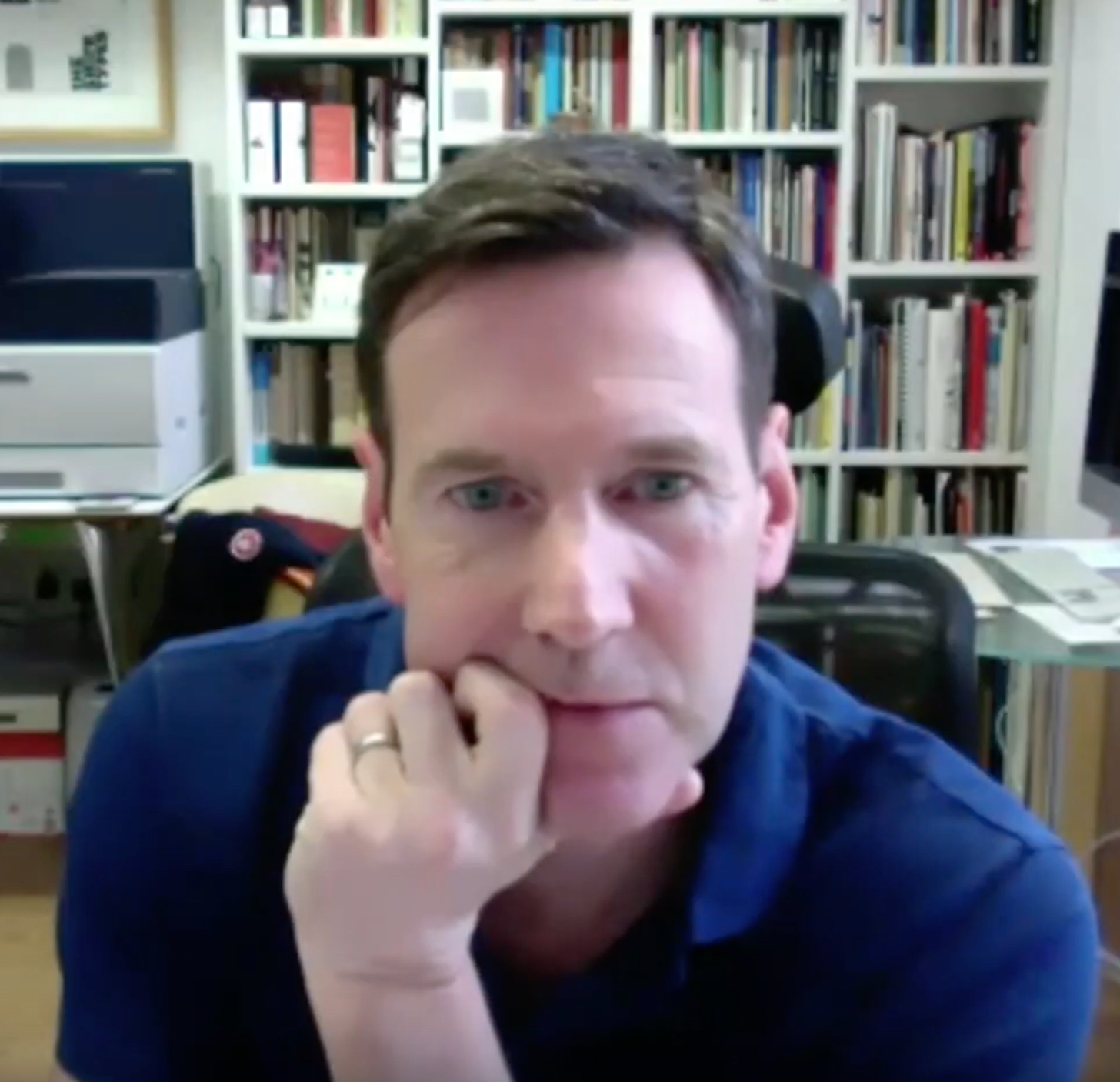
- Occupation: Type designer
- Notable work: Bliss, Corbel, Fenland

Jeremy Tankard is a British type designer. Tankard has designed retail fonts independently and for FontShop and Adobe. Corbel was designed for Microsoft and has been included in Microsoft Office and Windows since 2006.

Tankard has also designed custom corporate typefaces for organisations such as Sheffield City Council, Falmouth University and Christchurch Art Gallery.

Some of his typeface designs such as FF Disturbance and Blue Island are experimental and based on distorting the alphabet, through a unicase design in Disturbance and the use of ligatures to connect letters in unexpected ways in Blue Island. Tankard’s Bliss design, used by Amazon, is more traditional and loosely based on humanist sans-serif designs such as Johnston, Gill Sans and Syntax. Tankard studied at the Royal College of Art.
