= Bliss (typeface) =

Humanist sans-serif typeface

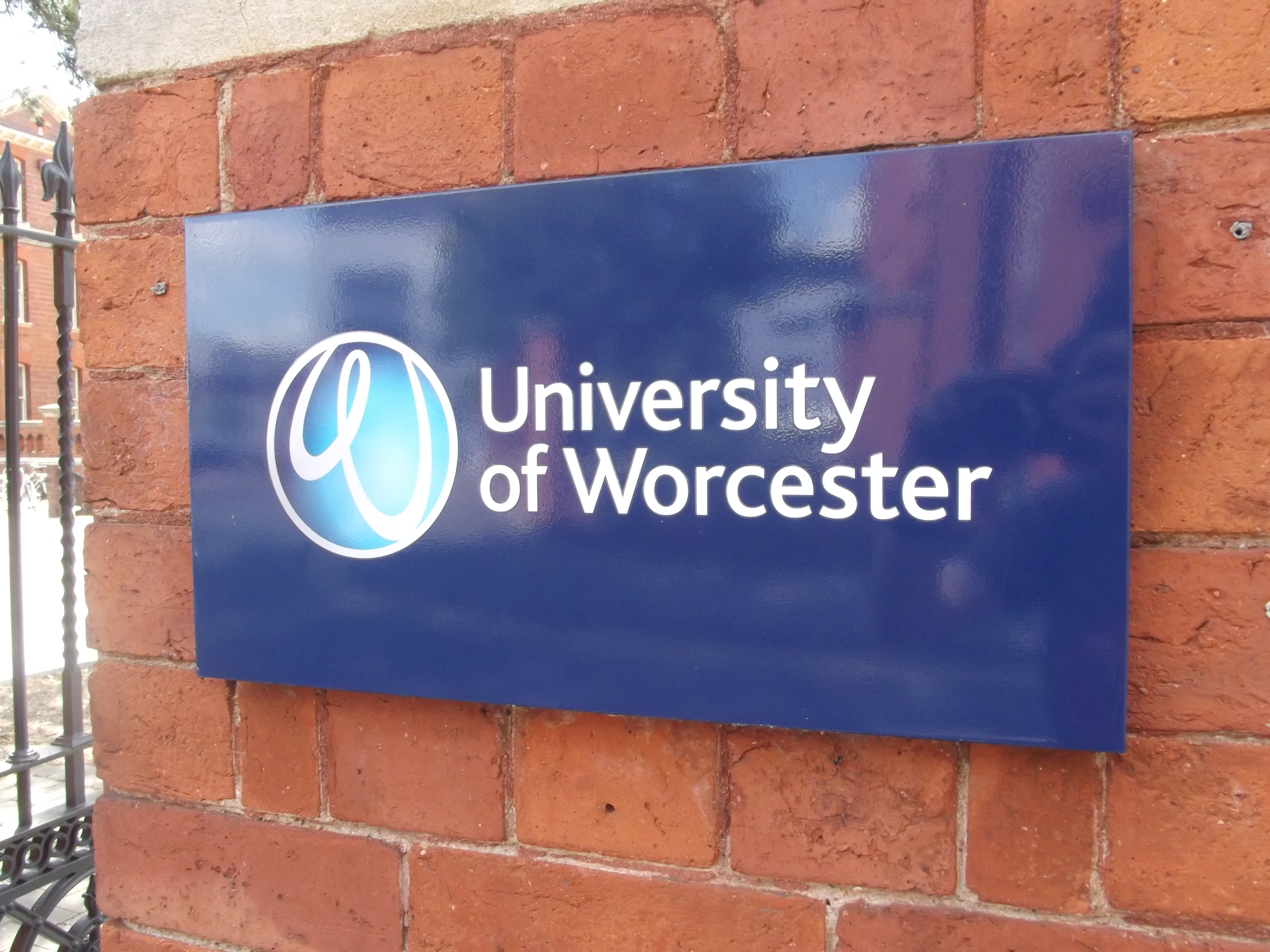
Bliss on the University of Worcester logo.

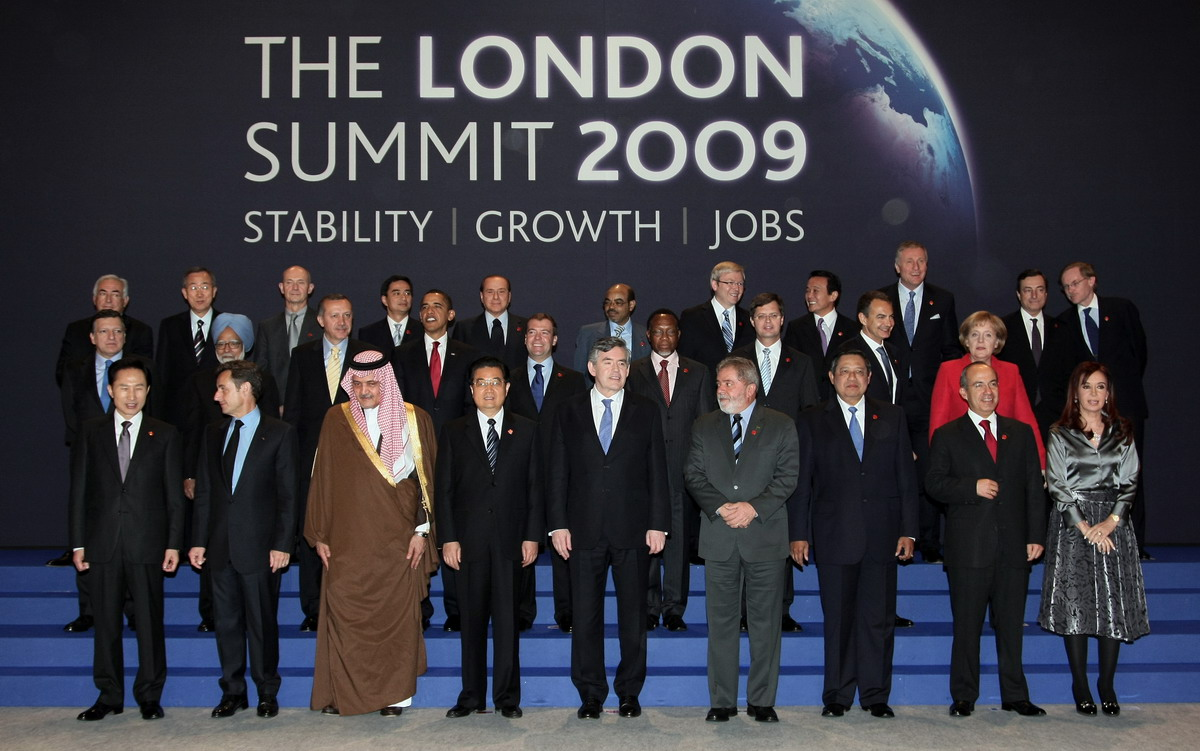
Bliss on the London G20 summit logo.

Bliss is a humanist sans-serif typeface family designed by Jeremy Tankard.

Bliss is a design in the British humanist style, based on the Johnston typeface of London Underground as well as Gill Sans and Syntax, but with a more uniform style with greater evenness and similarity between weights. Tankard added some asymmetries to break from a purely geometric structure, such as sheared cuts on the capital 'E' and 'T'.

Describing it, Tankard wrote that "forms were chosen for their simplicity, legibility, and ‘Englishness’", and that his goal was to create "the first commercial typeface with an English feel since Gill Sans."

As of 2018, Bliss is used as a corporate font by the universities of Worcester, Bath Spa and Solent, the Arts and Humanities Research Council, Dignity Health, and the HADOPI institute, and by Edexcel. In Canada, this font is also used in the logo of WestJet and Scouts Canada.
