= Cambria (typeface) =

Serif font family

- Category: Serif
- Classification: Transitional
- Designers: Jelle Bosma, Steve Matteson and Robin Nicholas; Cambria Math: Jelle Bosma, Ross Mills, John Hudson, Geraldine Wade, Mike Duggan, Greg Hitchcock, Andrei Burago, Vivek Garg
- Foundry: Microsoft, Tiro Typeworks (Cambria Math)
- Date released: 2005
- License: Proprietary

Cambria is a transitional serif typeface commissioned by Microsoft and distributed with Windows and Office. It was designed by Dutch typeface designer Jelle Bosma in 2004, with input from Steve Matteson and Robin Nicholas. It is intended as a serif font that is suitable for body text, that is very readable, printed small or displayed on a low-resolution screen and has even spacing and proportions.

It is part of the ClearType Font Collection, a suite of fonts from various designers released with Windows Vista. All of their names start with the letter C to reflect that they were designed to work well with Microsoft's ClearType text rendering system, a text rendering engine designed to make text clearer to read on LCD monitors. The other fonts in the same group are Calibri, Candara, Consolas, Constantia and Corbel.

Cambria has been designed to be a potential replacement for Times New Roman as the two typeface serve the same function as a workhorse typeface suitable for use in text almost anywhere.

== Design ==
Diagonal and vertical hairlines and serifs are relatively strong, while horizontal serifs are small and intend to emphasize stroke endings rather than stand out themselves. This principle is most noticeable in the italics where the lowercase characters are subdued in style. It is somewhat more condensed than average for a font of its kind. A profile of Bosma for the Monotype website commented, "One of the defining features of the typeface is its contrast between heavy vertical serifs and hairlines—which keep the font sturdy, and ensures the design is preserved at small sizes—and its relatively thin horizontals, which ensure the typeface remains crisp when used at larger sizes." Bosma describes it as a "transitional slab-serif hybrid."

Many aspects of the design are somewhat blocky to render well on screen, and full stops are square rather than round. Designers have recommended avoiding using it in printed text because of this: designer Matthew Butterick described it as too monotonous to be attractive on paper. Bosma compared it to optical sizes of fonts designed to be printed small: "The design is a bit like an old metal type font. In those days sizes had their own drawing, so that small sizes are wider and have a lower contrast compared to large fonts in the same design: optical correction. In this sense, Cambria is like a small size font, except that it may also be used at large sizes."

As with the other ClearType fonts, both lining figures and text figures are offered. Lining figures are the default, and are shown on the sample image.

== Cambria Math ==
This is a variant designed for mathematical and scientific texts, as a replacement for Times New Roman. Cambria Math was the first font to implement the OpenType math extension, itself inspired by TeX. Led by Jelle Bosma of Agfa Monotype and Ross Mills of Tiro Typeworks, the project was planned when development of Cambria had started, but Cambria Math was developed in three stages.

== Availability ==
Normal, bold, italic and bold italic Cambria text

Cambria is distributed with all Windows versions since Windows Vista, all Microsoft Office versions since Microsoft Office 2007 for Windows and Microsoft Office 2008 for Mac, and Microsoft Office 2007 viewers and converters. Cambria (Regular) and Cambria Math are packaged together as a TrueType Collection (TTC) file. Microsoft Office 2008 for Mac does not include Cambria Math, as OMML is not supported. Therefore, the Macintosh version of Cambria is packaged as individual TrueType Font (TTF) files, rather than a single TTC file.

This font, along with Calibri, Candara, Consolas, Corbel and Constantia, is also distributed with Microsoft Excel Viewer, Microsoft PowerPoint Viewer, the Microsoft Office Compatibility Pack for Microsoft Windows and the Open XML File Format Converter for Mac. For use in other operating systems, such as Linux, cross-platform use and web use it is not available as a freeware.

The typeface is licensed by Ascender Corporation for use by end users and consumer electronics device manufacturers. The typeface is also licensed by Monotype Imaging to printer manufacturers as part of the Vista 8 Font Set package.

=== Caladea ===
In 2013, as part of Chrome, Google released a freely-licensed font called Caladea, which is metric-compatible to Cambria (i.e. can replace it in a document without changing the layout). It is based on Cambo, a font developed by the Argentine type foundry Huerta Tipográfica. Despite being metric-compatible, Caladea covers much smaller language range, e.g. it doesn't support Cyrillic, Greek and advanced typographic features like ligatures, old style numerals or fractions.

== Usages ==
Cambria Math is used for presentation of Office MathML equations in Microsoft Office 2007 and later.

The free typesetting systems XeTeX and LuaTeX can make direct use of Cambria Math as an alternative to traditional TeX mathematical fonts.

Cambria is available for use in Google's Google Drive suite of web applications.

- Used as the default font for most document typing applications.
- Cambria is also used as the default font of mathematical equations in Google's document editor web app Google Docs.

Technical standards published by CEN use Cambria 11pt for body text. One example of such a standard is EN 301 549, European Standard for Digital Accessibility.

== See also ==
- Asana-Math – the first free font that could be used instead of Cambria Math with Microsoft Office 2007.
- Latin Modern – a version of Computer Modern with support for OpenType math
- Neo Euler – a version of AMS Euler with support for OpenType math
- XITS – a fork of the STIX fonts with support for OpenType math
