= Consolas =

Monospaced sans-serif font

- Category: Monospaced, sans-serif
- Classification: Humanist
- Designer: Luc(as) de Groot
- Foundry: Microsoft
- Date released: November 2006; 19 years ago
- License: Proprietary
- Sample

Consolas is a monospaced typeface designed by Luc(as) de Groot. It is a part of the ClearType Font Collection, a suite of fonts that take advantage of Microsoft's ClearType font rendering technology. It has been included with Windows since Windows Vista, Microsoft Office 2007 and Microsoft Visual Studio 2010. It is the only standard Windows Vista font with a slash through the zero character. It is the default font for Microsoft Notepad starting with Windows 8.

== Characteristics ==
Consolas supports the following OpenType layout features: stylistic alternates, localized forms, uppercase-sensitive forms, oldstyle figures, lining figures, arbitrary fractions, superscript, subscript.

Although Consolas is designed as a replacement for Courier New, only 713 glyphs were initially available, as compared to Courier New (2.90)'s 1,318 glyphs. In version 5.22, support for Greek Extended, Combining Diacritical Marks For Symbols, Number Forms, Arrows, Box Drawing, and Geometric Shapes was added. In version 5.32 the total number of supported glyphs was 2,735. In version 7.00 there are 3,030 glyphs in total.

== Availability ==
This font, along with Calibri, Cambria, Candara, Corbel and Constantia, was also distributed with Microsoft Excel Viewer, Microsoft PowerPoint Viewer, the Microsoft Office Compatibility Pack for Microsoft Windows and the Open XML File Format Converter for Mac.

Consolas is also available for licensing from LucasFonts and Ascender Corporation.

Bare Bones Software has licensed the font from Ascender for use in their text editor BBEdit.

=== Alternatives ===
- Inconsolata, an open source font inspired by Consolas, is available on Google Fonts.

== See also ==
- Cascadia Code
