= E-Ukraine =

Neo-grotesque sans-serif typeface

e-Ukraine
- Category: Sans-serif
- Classification: Neo-grotesque
- Designer(s): Dmytro Rastvortsev
- Foundry: Fedoriv
- Date released: 2019
- License: Creative Commons Attribution 4.0 International
- Variations: e-Ukraine Head

e-Ukraine is a sans-serif typeface developed by Fedoriv design agency for Ukrainian government ministries, agencies and corporations. According to the agency, the typeface should become the basis of Ukraine's visual style online.

One of its variations, e-Ukraine Head absorbed the traditional forms of Ukrainian graphical culture of the beginning of the 20th century that partially inherited esthetics of Ukrainian baroque. This typeface is used for headers and main messages in text.

== License ==
The official site footer statement is "All content is available under Creative Commons Attribution 4.0 International license unless stated otherwise". No other license is mentioned anywhere on the page or in typeface's official archive's, thus the license applies to the typefaces.
