= Eurocrat (typeface) =

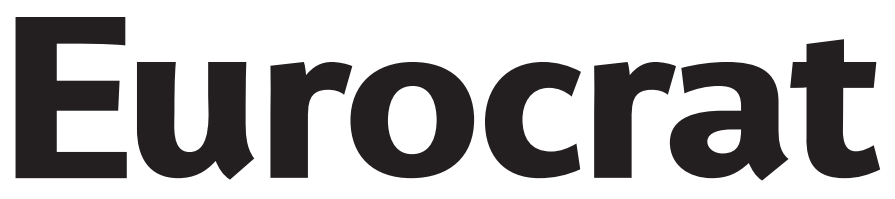
- Category: Sans-Serif
- Designer(s): Adrian Williams
- Foundry: Club Type
- Date released: 1987

Eurocrat is a sans-serif typeface designed by Adrian Williams in 1986 for Club Type.

== Name and Design ==
Eurocrat was inspired by the work of Members of the European Parliament of the European Economic Community. It attempts to combine various aspects of different European nationalities such that no one has dominance.
