= Look Communications =

- Company type: Public (NEX: LOK.H)
- Industry: Telecommunications
- Founded: 1997
- Defunct: 2009 (telecommunications services); 2013 (company name)
- Fate: Renamed ONEnergy Inc. in 2013, now an energy supplier
- Headquarters: Milton, Ontario
- Key people: Gerald T McGoey (Vice-Chairman and CEO of Look)
- Products: Cable television, High speed internet, Web hosting
- Revenue: $30 million CAD (2006)
- Website: look.ca (archive)

Look Communications (NEX: LOK.H) was a telecommunication company that has been in liquidation from November 2009. It was a digital wireless cable, internet service, and web hosting provider. It was once linked to former crown corporation Teleglobe and Chinese ISP Inter Pacific Online.

Founded in 1997, Look's head office was in Milton, Ontario, though most of its departments and employees were based in its Montreal office. It was listed on the TSX Venture Exchange under the symbols "LOK" and "LOK.A". Look had approximately 60,000 television customers at its peak. Look had the slogan "At Look, it's simple!".

== History ==
Look TV was founded in August 1997 as a digital wireless cable provider based in Etobicoke, Ontario. It started providing television service in 1997 for Southern Ontario, and 1998 for Quebec and Eastern Ontario. In 1999, Look TV and Internet Direct (Canadian ISP operating in B.C., Alberta, Manitoba, Ontario and Quebec.) merged to become Look Communications, with Look stockholders receiving 60% of the combined entity and Internet Direct stockholders receiving the remaining 40%.

Look Communications filed for bankruptcy protection in 2001.

Beginning in 2002, Unique Broadband System (UBS) acquired a stake in Look. By the end of 2003, UBS owned 51% of Look's stock, making Look a subsidiary of UBS. At that time, Look moved its headquarters from Oakville, Ontario to UBS's headquarters in Milton, Ontario.

Despite re-emerging from bankruptcy in 2002, Look never regained profitability and continued losing millions of dollars for the years to come. On December 1, 2008, Look Communications announced that it was selling off its assets. On May 14, 2009, the Ontario Superior Court of Justice approved the sale to Inukshuk Wireless Partnership. On November 15, 2009, Look's television customer base was acquired by Bell Canada which folded it into its Bell Satellite TV division while the internet consumer base was absorbed by Telnet Communications.

Although Look Communications no longer had any customers and had terminated its employees, the company still existed and was in the process of liquidating its remaining assets.

On March 26, 2013, Look Communications announced a proposed change of business by acquiring all of the outstanding shares of Sunwave Gas & Power Inc. ("Sunwave"), a supplier of innovative, competitive energy products and services. On July 9, 2013, the acquisition was completed.

On July 12, 2013, Look Communications Inc. changed its name for ONEnergy Inc., a company classified as a natural gas supplier based in Toronto, Ontario.

== Service offered ==
Look provided its digital television and wireless Internet services using a Multichannel Multipoint Distribution System (MMDS) technology, operating with 90 MHz of capacity in the 2.5 GHz band (the only company in Canada with approximately 90 MHz of spectrum and a broadcast license for mobile video services in Canada). Look had exclusive use of these frequencies since it received licenses from the Canadian Radio-television and Telecommunications Commission (CRTC) as a "broadcast distribution undertaking". With this MMDS technology, television, audio and data signals were received at Look's headend and digitally transmitted via fibre optics links to broadcast sites. The signals were then broadcast over the air from one of several transmission towers or base stations to a receiving antenna at subscribers' homes or businesses.
