= Sweden Sans =

Sans-serif typeface

- Category: Sans-serif
- Classification: Mixed
- Designer(s): Stefan Hattenbach; Jesper Robinell
- Date released: 2013

Sweden Sans is a sans-serif typeface developed by the Swedish design agency Söderhavet, made for use by Swedish government ministries, agencies and corporations.

== Development ==
In 2012, the type designers Stefan Hattenbach and Jesper Robinell from the Stockholm design studio Söderhavet were commissioned by the Swedish Institute for Standards and The Council for the Promotion of Sweden, among others, to develop a brand design for the country of Sweden that would represent the country visually in a uniform manner to the outside world.

In 2013, work on the font family was completed. The font family contained two weights for normal and bold text when released in 2013. In 2020, the font family was revised and a slightly lighter weight (Book) and a semi-bold weight were added. Sweden Sans has no weights for italic text.
