= Breeze Sans =

Humanist sans-serif typeface

- Category: Sans-serif
- Classification: Humanist
- Commissioned by: Samsung
- Foundry: Dalton Maag (Breeze Sans) and Fontrix (fallback fonts)
- Date released: 2013
- License: Apache License

Breeze Sans is a humanist sans-serif typeface for the Latin, Greek, and Cyrillic writing systems designed by Dalton Maag for Samsung. It is the user interface font of the Tizen operating system (starting with Tizen 2.4) and the Samsung Galaxy Watch.

Previous versions used Tizen Sans, a separate typeface designed by Fontrix. Tizen also uses fallback Breeze Sans fonts for other writing systems designed by Fontrix.

Breeze Sans is available in five weights (Thin, Light, Regular, Medium and Bold) with condensed styles to complement them. There are no italic or oblique styles however.
