= Thesis (typeface) =

Font superfamily

TheSans
- Category: Sans-serif
- Classification: Humanist
- Designer: Luc(as) de Groot
- Foundry: FontFabrik
- Date created: 1994

Thesis is a large typeface family designed by Luc(as) de Groot. The typefaces were designed between 1994 and 1999 to provide a modern humanist family. Each typeface is available in a variety of weights as well as in italic. Originally released by FontFont in 1994, it has been sold by de Groot through his imprint LucasFonts since 2000.

Thesis fonts have become popular and can be seen in various publications or logotypes.

To create a varied range of fonts of different thicknesses and levels of condensation, Thesis was developed using multiple master technology, in which weights were created by 'averaging' and extending the trend between a thick and thin design to create a smooth, continuous trend in styles from thin to very bold. The fonts also include a large number of stylistic alternate characters.

The family is a font superfamily, since it includes both serif and sans-serif designs. The font was used by the Spanish telecommunications company Movistar.

== TheSans ==
A humanist sans-serif font family, somewhat similar to Syntax (1968) and Frutiger (1976). It included fonts in 8 weights and 2 widths, with complementary italic fonts. A distinctive figure is the 'Q' with the detached tail, somewhat similar to that on Dwiggins' Metro; an alternate is provided for when this is unsuitable.

In TheSans Condensed, each weight only includes roman and italic, but all 4 number styles can be found.

=== TheSansMono ===
It is a monospaced variant. 3 widths have been produced. All fonts use hanging monospaced figures.

=== TheSansTypewriter ===
It is a monospaced variant with ragged strokes. It included fonts in regular and bold weights in the widest TheSansMono width, with complementary italic fonts. It uses hanging monospaced figures.

== TheSerif ==

It is a slab serif font family. It included fonts in 8 weights and 1 width, with complementary italic fonts.

== TheMix ==
It is a slab serif font family, but using only serif on upper portion of small letters. It included fonts in 8 weights and 1 width, with complementary italic fonts.

=== TheMixMono ===
It is a monospaced variant. Each weight only includes roman and italic. All fonts use hanging monospaced figures.

=== TheMix Arabic ===
It is a variant designed by Lucas de Groot in collaboration with Arab calligrapher Mouneer Al-Shaarani. Originally two weights, Regular and Bold, were designed for the Typographic Matchmaking Project organized by the Khatt Foundation. In subsequent years, LucasFonts developed a complete family with 8 weights from ExtraLight to Black, with extensive support for marks and vocalisation signs. Simultaneously TheSans Arabic was developed.

== Offshoot font families ==

Offshoot font families of the Thesis font superfamily include TheAntiqua, Nebulae, and JesusLovesYouAll.

TheAntiqua is a variant based on TheSerif. It included fonts in 7 weights and 1 width, with complementary italic fonts. OpenType feature includes small caps (roman only). TheAntiqua won an award in 1999 from Type Directors Club.

== Collections ==
Each of the family are categorized in following family collections: Classic, Basic, Office.

Classic family includes all 8 font weights, with roman, italic, small caps roman, small caps italic, expert, expert italic in each weight. It includes hanging proportional, hanging monospaced, lining proportional, lining monospaced figures; and additional f-ligatures. Expert fonts include arrows, swashes, fraction figures, alternate styles, mathematic symbols, ornaments.

Basic family includes all 8 font weights, but without small caps and expert fonts. It includes lining proportional figures (smaller than in classic).

Office family only includes Regular and Bold weights, with only roman and italic in each weight. It includes hanging monospaced figures.

de Groot's choice of weights to release was developed using an "interpolation theory". The optical interpolation b, in the three stems a (thinnest), b (interpolation) and c (thickest), is set to the geometric mean of a and c, i.e. b² = ac (as opposed to the linear arithmetic mean).

As an amusement, de Groot also developed a number of parodic reworkings of Thesis, including Nebulae and JesusLovesYouAll.

== Uses of Thesis fonts ==
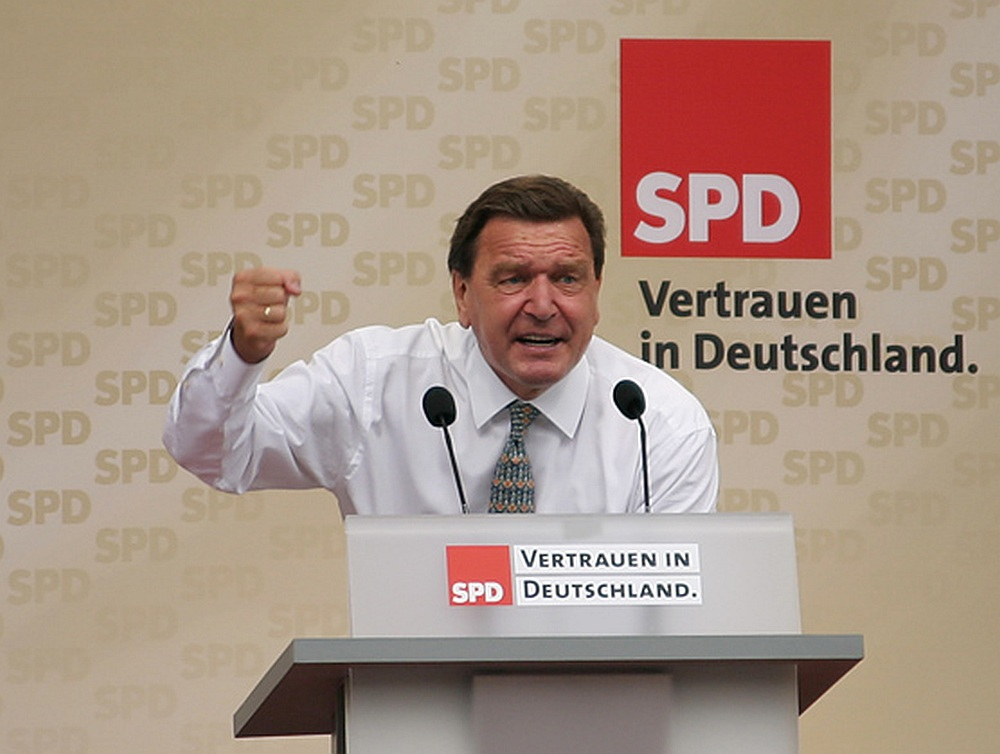
TheSans black caps used by the "Social Democratic Party of Germany - Trust in Germany" during the election in 2005.

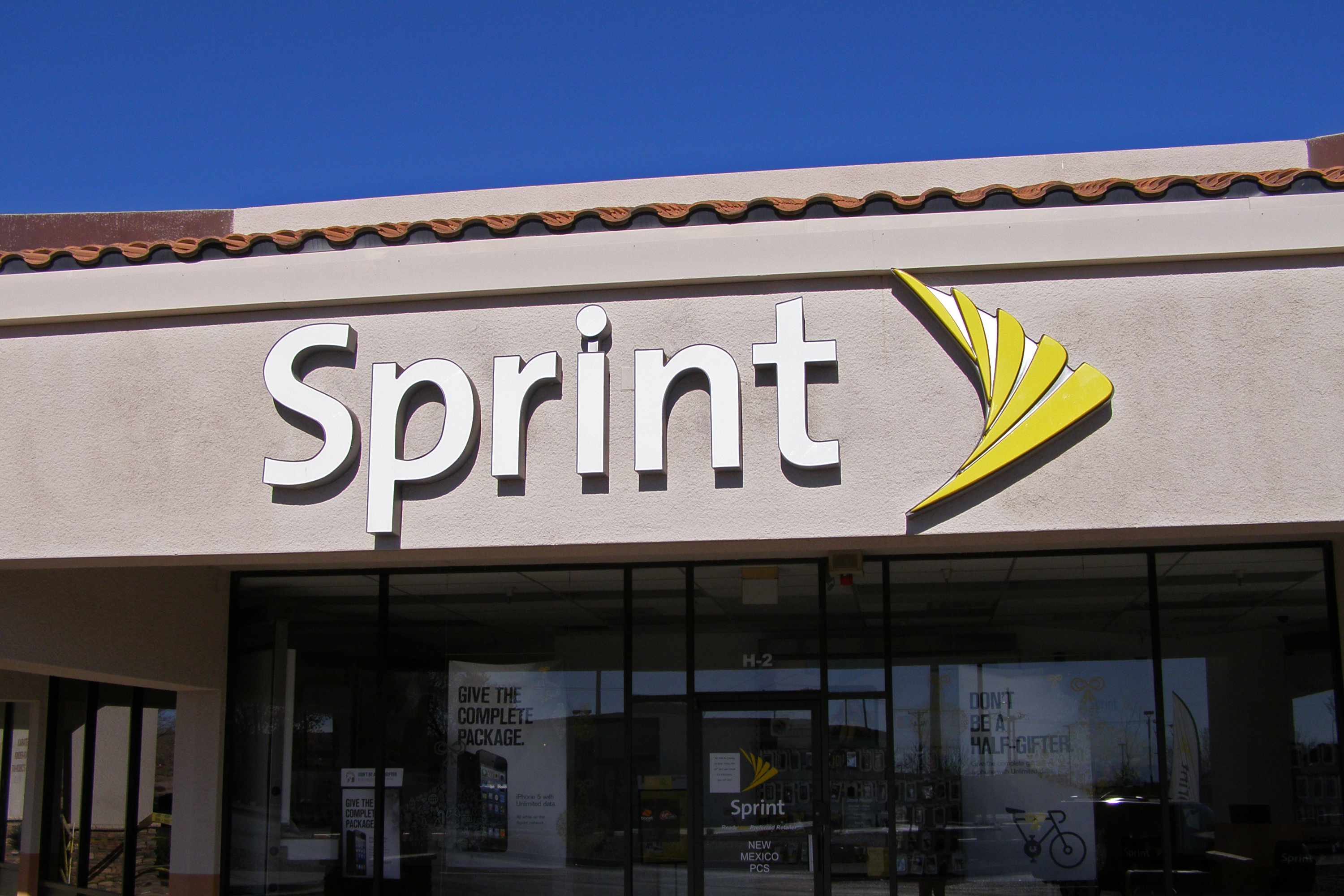
TheSans on a Sprint retail store

- BG Group – now taken over
- University of Zurich - TheSans
- Marque Bretagne — TheMix
- Office Depot — TheSerif
- Swisscom — TheSans and TheSerif
- Victoria and Albert Museum — TheSans (custom variant)
- Branding for the World Exposition 2000 in Hannover, Germany – TheSans
- Deutsche Welle - TheAntiqua
- ARD - TheSans and TheAntiqua
- Maastricht University - TheSans

== See also ==
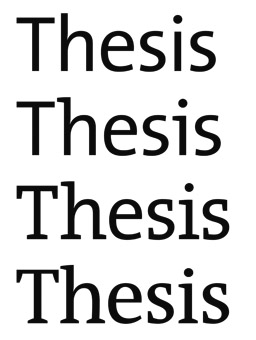
The same word in different styles

- Typography
