= Lucas de Groot =

Dutch artist (born 1963)

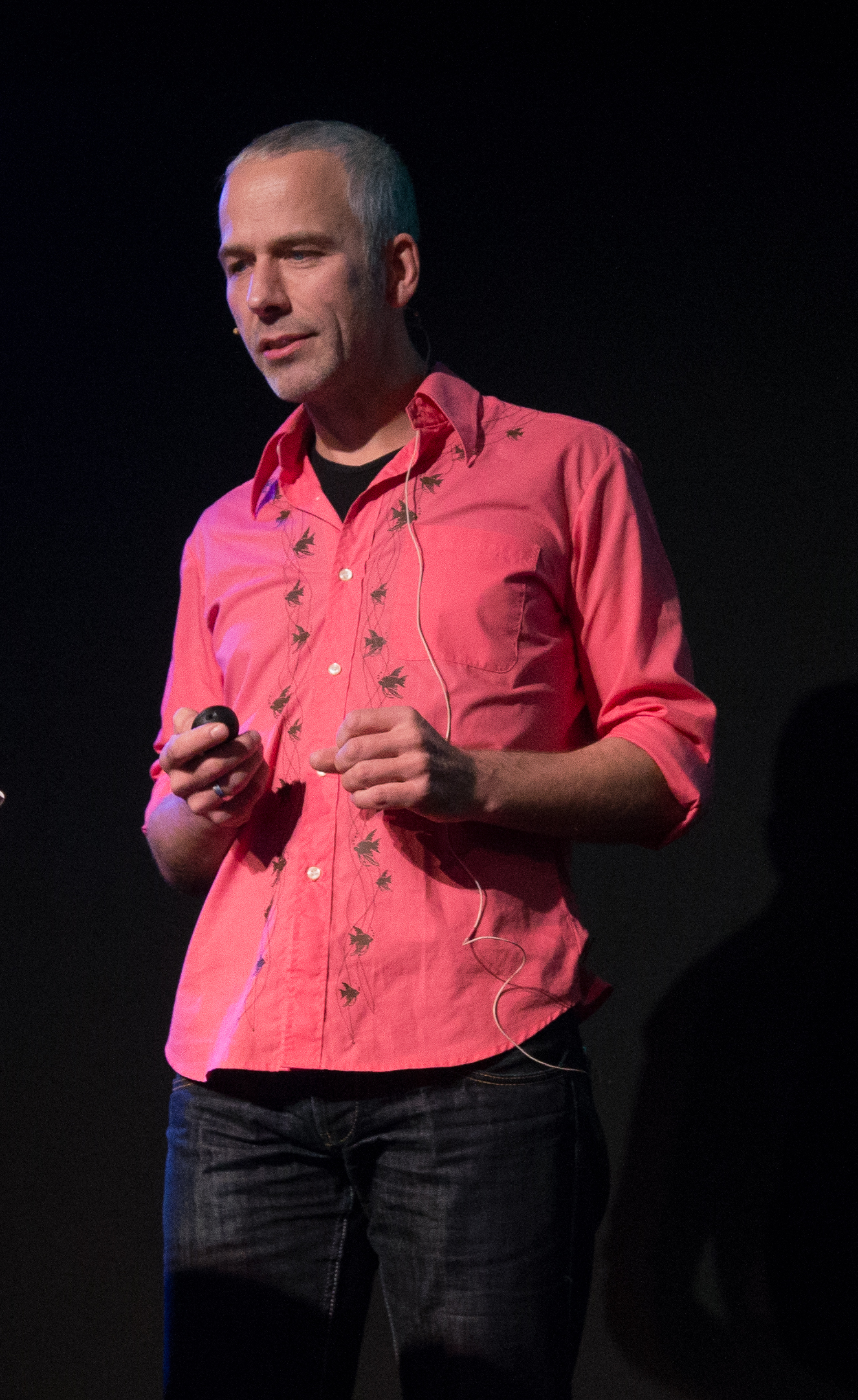
- Born: 21 June 1963 (age 63); Noordwijkerhout, Netherlands
- Occupation: Type designer
- Known for: Thesis; Calibri; Consolas
- Spouse: Sonja Knecht

Lucas de Groot (Dutch pronunciation: [ˈlykɑz də ˈɣroːt]; born 21 June 1963), known professionally as Luc(as) de Groot, is a Dutch type designer. He is the head of the type foundry Fontfabrik, also trading as LucasFonts.

De Groot is particularly known for Calibri, the longtime default font in Microsoft Office; the Thesis font superfamily; and Consolas. De Groot is considered an expert on using interpolative font design and stylistic alternates to develop large families with a wide range of features and languages supported.

== Biography ==
De Groot was born in the Netherlands and studied at the Royal Academy of Arts in The Hague. He adopted the name Luc(as) on his business card after graduating as a reference to people calling him by both "Luc" and "Lucas". After having worked for a few years at Amsterdam-based design agency BRS Premsela Vonk (since 2009 called Edenspiekermann), De Groot moved to Berlin to work at MetaDesign under Erik Spiekermann. Some of his early work included alternative versions of Frutiger, which much of his work is influenced by. While working at MetaDesign he began working on the Thesis family in his spare time, a project he described as being enabled by a lack of personal connections outside work. Thesis was initially published by Spiekermann's FontShop library before he established an independent company.

De Groot's work includes commercially released fonts and also custom families for particular clients: Corpid (previously AgroSans) for the Dutch Ministry of Agriculture; SunSans for Sun Microsystems; SpiegelSans and Taz for, respectively, the German magazines Der Spiegel and die tageszeitung; and FolhSerif for the Brazilian newspaper Folha. Some of these such as Taz have since become publicly available.

De Groot teaches at the Design Faculty of the Fachhochschule Potsdam or University of Applied Sciences in Potsdam, outside Berlin.

=== Fonts ===
Major fonts by de Groot include:

- Thesis, a font superfamily which contains the sans-serif TheSans and TheSans Mono, and the serif TheMix and TheAntiqua
- Taz for the newspaper die Tageszeitung
- FolhaSerif
- SunSans, for Sun Microsystems
- Calibri, for Microsoft
- Consolas (2004, released 2007), for Microsoft
- Spiegel
- Miele Elements
- TheBest, for Stiftung Warentest

As an amusement, de Groot also developed a number of parodic, spiky or distorted reworkings of Thesis, including Nebulae and JesusLovesYouAll.
