= Neuzeit S =

Geometric and neo-grotesque sans-serif typeface

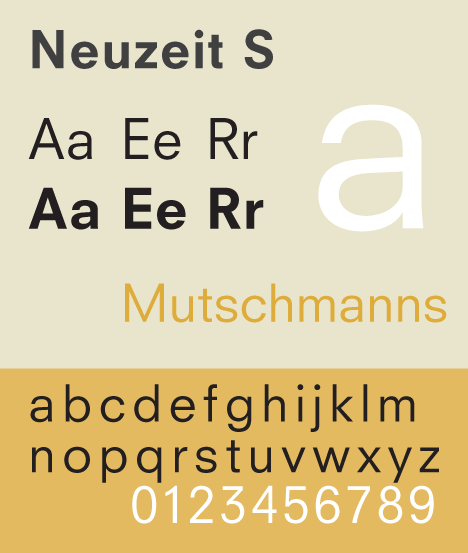
- Category: Sans-serif
- Classification: Geometric sans-serif Grotesque sans-serif
- Designer(s): Wilhelm Pischner
- Foundry: Stempel; Linotype
- Date released: 1928-9, 1959, 1966

Neuzeit S is a sans-serif typeface designed by Wilhelm Pischner in 1928 (as Neuzeit-Buch) and 1928 (as Neuzeit-Buch S) for Linotype and a corporate typeface for Siemens. The German name translates to English as "new time" and refers to the modern era. The face combines characteristics of both geometric and neo-grotesque sans-serif classifications, and is based on Neuzeit Grotesk, a more purely geometric sans-serif designed by Wilhelm Pischner in 1928 for the Stempel Type Foundry.

Neuzeit S is distinct for its contrast of wide circular characters o, O, p, q, and Q with the more compact characters h, n, u, and t.

- Fox News Channel uses this typeface as one of its lower third typefaces.
