= Dick Brass =

American journalist

- Education: Cornell University
- Spouse: Regina Dwyer

Dick Brass (born 1951) is a technology investor and executive, and a former newspaper reporter and editor.

== Early life and education ==
Brass attended Cornell University, where he was an editor of The Cornell Daily Sun and member of the Quill and Dagger society.

== Career ==
After a journalism career as a reporter and then copy editor at the New York Daily News, and a restaurant critic for Playboy Magazine and WNBC-TV, Brass entered the technology field.

In the late 1970s, Brass developed the first dictionary-based spelling checker and invented the electronic thesaurus. He founded Dictronics Publishing Inc, which acquired the exclusive rights to many of the world's most important reference works, including The Random House Dictionary and Roget's Thesaurus. Dictronics was sold to Wang Laboratories in 1983. In 1987, Brass joined Oracle Corporation as a vice president and served as president of one of its subsidiaries. He was involved in a proposed tie-up between Oracle and McCaw Cellular.

=== Investments ===
During the 1980s, Brass became one of the first investors in Omnipoint, a cell phone startup that through growth and merger ultimately emerged as T-Mobile. Brass helped recruit various other lead investors, including Oracle's founder and CEO Larry Ellison and New York attorney and philanthropist James Ross. Omnipoint merged with Voicestream Wireless Corp in 1999. In July 2001, Voicestream was acquired by Deutsche Telekom for $50.7 billion, and in September 2002 changed the company name to T-Mobile.

In 1997, Brass joined Microsoft, serving as corporate vice president. He was responsible for the development of ClearType and led the project to develop the company's tablet PC and e-book. In October 1998, during his keynote speech at the world's first ebook conference in Gaithersberg, MD, Brass proposed the Open Ebook (OEB) standard, which was adopted by most of the pioneering e-book publishers. It became the basis for the organization and formatting of most e-books in the world today and evolved into the popular ePub format in 2007. Brass was recognized for this contribution with an award for meritorious service from the government's National Institute of Standards and Technology (NIST). Brass also led the company's Emerging Technology group and its automotive software unit. He retired in 2004.

In February, 2010, he wrote a widely read op-ed for The New York Times in which he argued that Microsoft had lost its ability to effectively innovate in many fields and needed to regain creative leadership. He blamed the highly competitive corporate culture, which he said undermined true innovations created by Microsoft's labs and engineers.
