= Mamoun Sakkal =

Syrian calligrapher

Mamoun Sakkal (Arabic: مأمون صقال) is a Syrian type designer, artist and calligrapher. He was born in Aleppo and later immigrated to the United States.

== Awards ==
- ADC Typography Bronze Cube 2018 for Sakkal Kitab Font.
- Third International Calligraphy Competition: First Award in Kufi style, [Research Centre for Islamic History, Art and Culture, Istanbul, Turkey - 1993.
- First place award in the Arab Human Development Report cover design competition, United Nations Development Programme, New York City - 2003.
- Two Awards of Excellence for Sakkal Seta and Arabic Typesetting typefaces, Type Directors Club of New York International typeface design competition, 2003, and for Microsoft Uighur typeface in 2004.
- First Prize in Letter Arts Review Magazine International Competition in 2005.
