= Constantia (typeface) =

- Category: Serif
- Classification: Transitional
- Designer: John Hudson
- Foundry: Microsoft
- Date released: 2004
- License: Proprietary

Constantia is a serif typeface designed by John Hudson and commissioned by Microsoft. It is a transitional serif design, influenced by Eric Gill’s Perpetua design. Development of the typeface began in 2003 and it was released in 2004.

Constantia is part of the ClearType Font Collection, a suite of fonts from various designers released with Windows Vista. All start with the letter C to reflect that they were designed to work well with Microsoft’s ClearType text rendering system, a text rendering engine designed to make text clearer to read on LCD monitors. The other fonts in the suite are Calibri, Cambria, Candara, Consolas and Corbel.

== Features ==
Constantia was designed for either print or on-screen uses. Numerals are text figures by default, as seen on the sample image; the font also includes lining figures as an alternate style. Reviewing it for the website Typographica, Raph Levien described it as likely to be “everyone’s favourite face [in the suite]...a highly readable Roman font departing only slightly from the classical model, [but] it still manages to be fresh and new. It takes some inspiration from Perpetua...but the triangular serifs bring to mind a chisel, and the font has enough calligraphic flavor to recall Palatino.” Among other features, the design includes small capitals, alternative spacing and punctuation for all caps text, numbers enclosed by circles, and superscript and subscript glyphs.

A transitional serif design, the design features moderate contrast between thick and thin strokes and a nearly-vertical axis. To render well in ClearType, the letters O and Q are slightly squared-off.

It is distributed with Microsoft Excel Viewer, Microsoft PowerPoint Viewer, the Microsoft Office Compatibility Pack for Microsoft Windows and the Open XML File Format Converter for Mac.

Explaining its name, Hudson wrote: “I can’t remember all the possible names I came up with, each of which ended up rejected after international trademark searches...I’d been singing some psalms during vespers, and noticed the word constantia. Hey, I thought, that starts with C!” Writing in 2011, Hudson commented, “I actually don’t like the name Constantia very much, and every time I see the sea birds on the dock while I’m waiting for the ferry I wish I’d thought to call it Cormorant.”
