= Hans Eduard Meier =

Swiss type designer (1922–2014)

Hans Eduard Meier (30 December 1922, Horgen, Switzerland — 15 July 2014, Horgen) was a Swiss type designer. He created the neohumanist typeface Syntax at Stempel Foundry, along with Barbedor (1984), Letter (1992) and Lapidar (1995).

== Awards ==
Linotype Syntax won the Type Directors Club Type Design Competition award in the year 2000 under the text or display type systems category.

Bitstream Humanist 531 Cyrillic won awards at the type design contests bukva:raz!, and Kyrillitsa'99, under the text category.

== Typefaces designed by Hans Eduard Meier ==
- Syntax - conceived between 1955 and 1964, metal cast by Stempel AG between 1968 and 1972, digitalized by Adobe in 1984, also released as Bitstream Humanist 531.
- Barbedor - 1984.
- ITC Syndor - 1986, International Typeface Corporation.
- Letter (Syntax Letter) - 1992, Linotype.
- Oberon - 1992.
- SNB-Alphabet -1994, for the Swiss Bank.
- Lapidar (Syntax Lapidar) - 1995, Linotype.
- LTSyntax - 1997, Linotype.
- Syntax Serif - 1999, Linotype.
- ABC-Schulschrift - for Swiss school primers, 2001–2008.
- Elysa - 2002, Elsner+Flake.
- Gesta Antiqua - 2004, Elsner+Flake
- Meier Kapitalis - 2012–2014, Elsner+Flake

== Bibliography ==
- Devroye, Luc. "Hans Eduard Meier". Type Design Information.
- Max Caflisch, Die Druckschriften [1955 bis 1995] von Hans Eduard Meier, dans: TM-RSI N° 6/1996.
- Dossier Hans Eduard Meier, TM-RSI, N° 3/2014, pp. 1–26, contributions by d'Erich Alb, Roger Chatelain, Sumner Stone, Katharine Wolff, Max Caflisch. Typografische Monatsblätter.
- Jubert, Roxane (2012). "Hans Eduard Meier, a life dedicated to letter design". Typotheque.com.
