= FS Me =

Humanist sans-serif typeface

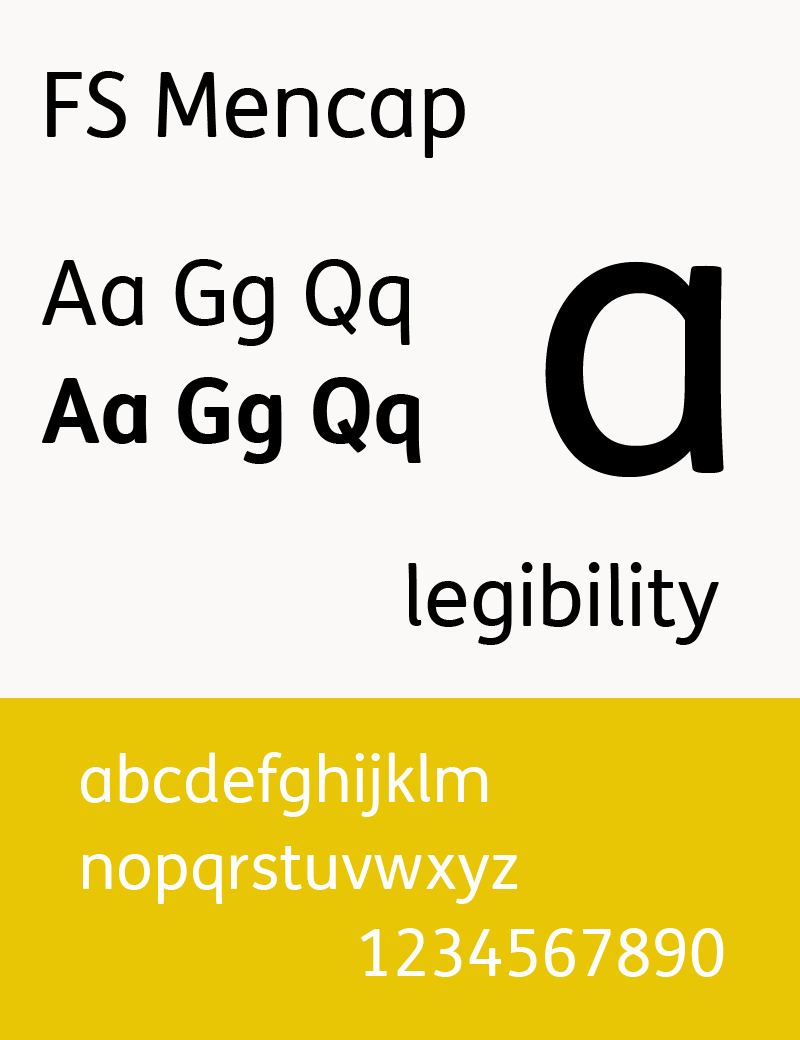
- Category: Sans-serif
- Classification: Humanist
- Designer(s): Jason Smith
- Foundry: Fontsmith
- Date created: 2008

FS Me is a typeface/font that has been described as the first to have been designed in consultation with a group of people with learning disabilities and designed for use by this population. It was developed by Jason Smith in response to a commission from the charity Mencap in 2008. It was the only font featured in the D&AD Annual 2009 covering advertising and design work.

The digital version of FS Me was commissioned by YouView in 2008 as part of the core accessibility specification of the platform that was created by Gareth Ford Williams.
