= Candara =

Humanist sans-serif typeface

- Category: Sans-serif
- Designer: Gary Munch
- Foundry: Munchfonts, Microsoft
- Date released: 2004
- License: Proprietary
- Sample

Comparison of Candara (regular and italics) with Arial (grey), Latin script (Czech text example) and Greek example

Candara is a humanist sans-serif typeface designed by Gary Munch and commissioned by Microsoft. It is part of the ClearType Font Collection, a suite of fonts from various designers released with Windows Vista, their names all starting with the letter C to reflect that they were designed to work well with Microsoft's ClearType text rendering system. The others are Calibri, Cambria, Consolas, Corbel and Constantia.

== Features ==
Candara's verticals show both convex and concave curvature with entasis and ectasis on opposite sides of stems, high-branching arcades in the lowercase, large apertures in all open forms, and unique ogee curves on diagonals. Its italic includes many calligraphic and serif font influences, which are common in modern sans-serif typefaces. Calibri and Corbel, from the same family, have similar designs and spacing.

The family supports most of the WGL4 character set. OpenType features include automatic ligature sets, numerals (tabular, proportional, oldstyle and lining), numerator, denominator, scientific inferior subscripts, and small caps.

It is also distributed with Microsoft Excel Viewer, Microsoft PowerPoint Viewer, the Microsoft Office Compatibility Pack for Microsoft Windows and the Open XML File Format Converter for Mac. It is not available as a freeware for use in other operating systems such as Linux, cross-platform use, and web use.
