= Corbel (typeface) =

Humanist sans-serif typeface

- Category: Sans-serif
- Classification: Humanist
- Designer(s): Jeremy Tankard
- Foundry: Microsoft
- Date released: 2004
- License: Proprietary

Corbel is a humanist sans-serif typeface designed by Jeremy Tankard for Microsoft. It is part of the ClearType Font Collection, a suite of fonts from various designers released with Windows Vista. All start with the letter C to reflect that they were designed to work well with Microsoft's ClearType text rendering system, a text rendering engine designed to make text clearer to read on LCD monitors. The other fonts in the same group are Calibri, Cambria, Candara, Consolas and Constantia.

== Design ==
In a blurb for its use, Corbel was described as "designed to give an uncluttered, clean appearance on screen. The letter forms are open with soft, flowing curves. It is legible and clear at small sizes. At larger sizes the detailing and style of the shapes is more apparent." The italic style is a true italic, with influences from serif fonts and calligraphy, with many letters gaining a tail pointing to the right. Many aspects of its design are similar to Calibri and Candara, which are also humanist sans-serif designs; like them it is slightly more condensed than average. Font designer Raph Levien, reviewing it for Typographica, described it as similar to Frutiger. Tankard described his aims in the family's design: “I wanted to move away from the round i-dot sans fonts we've seen a lot of recently. Less cuddly, more assertive. I wanted the italic to be expressive, not a sloped roman."

Corbel by default renders numbers as text figures (old style or lowercase numerals), which are preferred for integrating figures into running text. This is an uncommon choice in sans-serif faces, especially those designed for display on a screen, but several of the other ClearType fonts also make this the default option; lining figures can be suggested using an OpenType stylistic alternates menu or CSS font-variant-numeric:lining-nums. Text figures are also found in Microsoft's serif Georgia typeface.

== Releases ==
It is distributed with Microsoft Excel Viewer, Microsoft PowerPoint Viewer, the Microsoft Office Compatibility Pack for Microsoft Windows and the Open XML File Format Converter for Mac.

For use in other operating systems, such as Linux, cross-platform use and web use it is not available as a freeware and is licensed and sold by Ascender.
