= Gautami (typeface) =

- Category: Sans-Serif
- Designer(s): Raghunath Joshi (Type Director), Omkar Shende
- Foundry: Microsoft Corporation
- Date released: 2001

Gautami is a Microsoft Windows typeface used to display the Telugu script. Versions of it have been supplied in Windows Server 2003, Windows Server 2008, Windows XP, Windows Vista, Windows 7 and Windows 8. It contains Unicode support for the following ranges:

- Basic Latin
- Latin-1 Supplement
- Telugu

The name "Gautami" was given by Radhika Mamidi, a resource person for Telugu, from the National Centre for Software Technology, working with R K Joshi's team. It refers to the tributary Gautami of Godavari River.
