= Vercetti Regular =

Sans-serif typeface

- Category: Sans serif
- Classification: Humanist; Geometric
- Designers: Filippos Fragkogiannis; Richard Mandona
- Date released: 8 September 2022
- Glyphs: 325
- License: Licence Amicale
- Design based on: MgOpen Moderna
- Also known as: Vercetti
- Sample
- Website: filipposfragkogiannis.com/fonts/vercetti-regular
- Latest release version: 1.001
- Latest release date: 23 March 2024

Lorem ipsum written in Vercetti Regular font

Vercetti Regular, also known as Vercetti, is a single-weight sans serif font distributed for free. The first version of Vercetti was released in 8 September 2022 under the license Licence Amicale, which allows users to share the font files with friends and colleagues.

== Background ==
Vercetti is a single-weight computer font distributed for free (as freeware), created by Greek graphic designer Filippos Fragkogiannis in collaboration with Russian type designer Richard Mandona.

Vercetti Regular is inspired by humanistic and geometric design elements. When creating Vercetti, the designers drew elements from an earlier open-source font called MgOpen Moderna.

The font includes has 326 glyphs, encompassing numbers, symbols, punctuation marks, and accents, making it suitable for all languages that use the Latin alphabet. It is available for download in the following file formats: OTF, TTF, WOFF, WOFF2.

== Awards ==
Vercetti Regular received an Award of Excellence at the 13th Annual Typography Competition, organized by the American magazine Communication Arts.

It also won other design industry awards, including a Silver Award at the 2024 Graphis Design Awards, a Merit at the 2022 Hiiibrand Awards and a Bronze Award at the 2023 Creativepool Annual.

Additionally, Vercetti Regular was named a Winner at the DNA Paris Design Awards 2023, won a Silver Award at the 2023 C-IDEA Design Awards, and secured three shortlist positions at the ADC 102nd Annual Awards.

Furthermore, the website Awwwards included Vercetti Regular in its list of the 100 best free fonts of 2022.

== Related pages ==
- Alphabet
- Digital distribution
- Typography
- Typeface
