= Andale =

Andale may refer to:

- Andalé Mono, a monospaced sans-serif typeface
- Andalé Sans, a proportional sans-serif typeface
- Andale, Kansas
- Ándale, the first episode of the third season of American television series Euphoria.
- Andale, Virginia, a location in Fallout 3, based on Annandale, Virginia
