= Man in Business Suit Levitating emoji =

Emoji depicting a levitating man wearing a suit

Appearance in Noto Emoji

Man in Business Suit Levitating (U+1F574 🕴 MAN IN BUSINESS SUIT LEVITATING) is an emoji depicting a man wearing a suit and fedora while levitating. Initially created as part of Webdings, the icon was made an emoji by the Unicode Consortium in 2014. The appearance of Man in Business Suit Levitating was originally based on the logo of 2 Tone Records; the logo was itself a depiction of reggae musician Peter Tosh, and is unrelated to The Matrix despite the superficial similarities in appearance.

== Development ==
=== Creation ===
Man in Business Suit Levitating was initially a part of the 1997 font Webdings, selected by the team developing Internet Explorer 4 as one of the font's 230 icons. The designer of the Man in Business Suit Levitating icon for Webdings was Vincent Connare, who also created Comic Sans and Trebuchet MS. According to Connare, the original Man in Business Suit Levitating icon was based on the keyword "jump" and modeled after the logo of 2 Tone Records, which he saw on the cover of an LP record he had by The Specials, a ska group that was one of his favorite bands. The 2 Tone Records logo (named Walt Jabsco) was in turn based on the appearance of reggae musician Peter Tosh in a 1964 photo of Bob Marley and the Wailers.

In Webdings, the symbol can be typed through the input that would create a lowercase "m" in a normal font.

=== As an emoji ===
In 2014, 17 years after its creation as part of Webdings, Man in Business Suit Levitating was made an emoji with the designation U+1F574 🕴 MAN IN BUSINESS SUIT LEVITATING. The addition was part of Unicode 7.0, which added various icons adapted from Webdings and Wingdings characters.

== Reception ==
...the man of the hour right now has got to be the Man In Business Suit Levitating emoji. He's mysterious, handsome and is floating in space like a little David Blaine that can fit in our pockets. What more can we possibly hope to get in the near future? What more can you ask for, Internet?!

— Dasha Fayvinova, in Bustle, October 2015

In 2014, shortly after its introduction as an emoji, New York reported that Man in Business Suit Levitating could signify "jumping for joy" or "mystery" while noting that it had been nicknamed "the Man in Black emoji" by some internet users. In 2015, Bustle published an article listing possible meanings for the emoji; author Dasha Fayvinova researched for the piece by texting people sentences including the emoji to see how they would interpret it.

In July 2016, The News Minute reported that some users of WhatsApp in India mistakenly believed that Man in Business Suit Levitating depicted Rajinikanth in his titular role in the then-upcoming film Kabali.

After being told by the BBC about the history of the emoji in 2021, Peter Tosh's children Andrew Tosh and Niambe McIntosh reacted positively. Tosh stated that "My father's music is message music, to uplift the world from its slumbering mentality," while McIntosh agreed that "he wanted [people] to dance to their own (political) awakening". Both expressed familiarity with the photo on which the icon that became the emoji was based.

== See also ==
- Face with Tears of Joy emoji
- Poop emoji
