= Webdings =

Typeface for dingbats (decorational symbols and glyphs)

- Category: Symbol
- Designers: Vincent Connare; Sue Lightfoot; Ian Patterson; Geraldine Wade
- Foundry: Microsoft

Webdings is a TrueType dingbat typeface developed in 1997. It was initially distributed with Internet Explorer 4.0, then as part of Core fonts for the Web, and is included in all versions of Microsoft Windows since Windows 98. All of the pictographic Webdings glyphs that were not unifiable with existing Unicode characters were added to the Unicode Standard when version 7.0 was released in June 2014.

== Symbol types ==
Webdings Encoding
- Language: Dingbat ornaments
- Definitions: UTC L2/12-368
- Classification: msttcore pi font
- Other related encodings: Marlett, Wingdings, Zapf Dingbats, Bookshelf Symbol 7

There are some "categories" of symbols in Webdings, i.e., groups of similar symbols. Symbol trends like this in the font include weather icons, land with different structures built on top, vehicles and ICT. Symbols which are the Webdings equivalent of characters not available on an English keyboard also exist in the font (for example, the dove and Earth symbols).

An unusual character in the font is the "man in business suit levitating". According to Vincent Connare, who designed the font, the character was intended as a nod to the logo of the British ska record label 2 Tone Records. The character has since been adopted as an emoji: U+1F574 🕴 MAN IN BUSINESS SUIT LEVITATING.

Connare also designed the lightning bolt symbol to resemble the one on the cover of the David Bowie album Aladdin Sane.

Following the controversy over possible antisemitic messages in the Wingdings font, Connare intentionally rendered the Webdings character sequence "NYC" as an eye, a heart, and a city skyline, referring to the I Love New York logo.

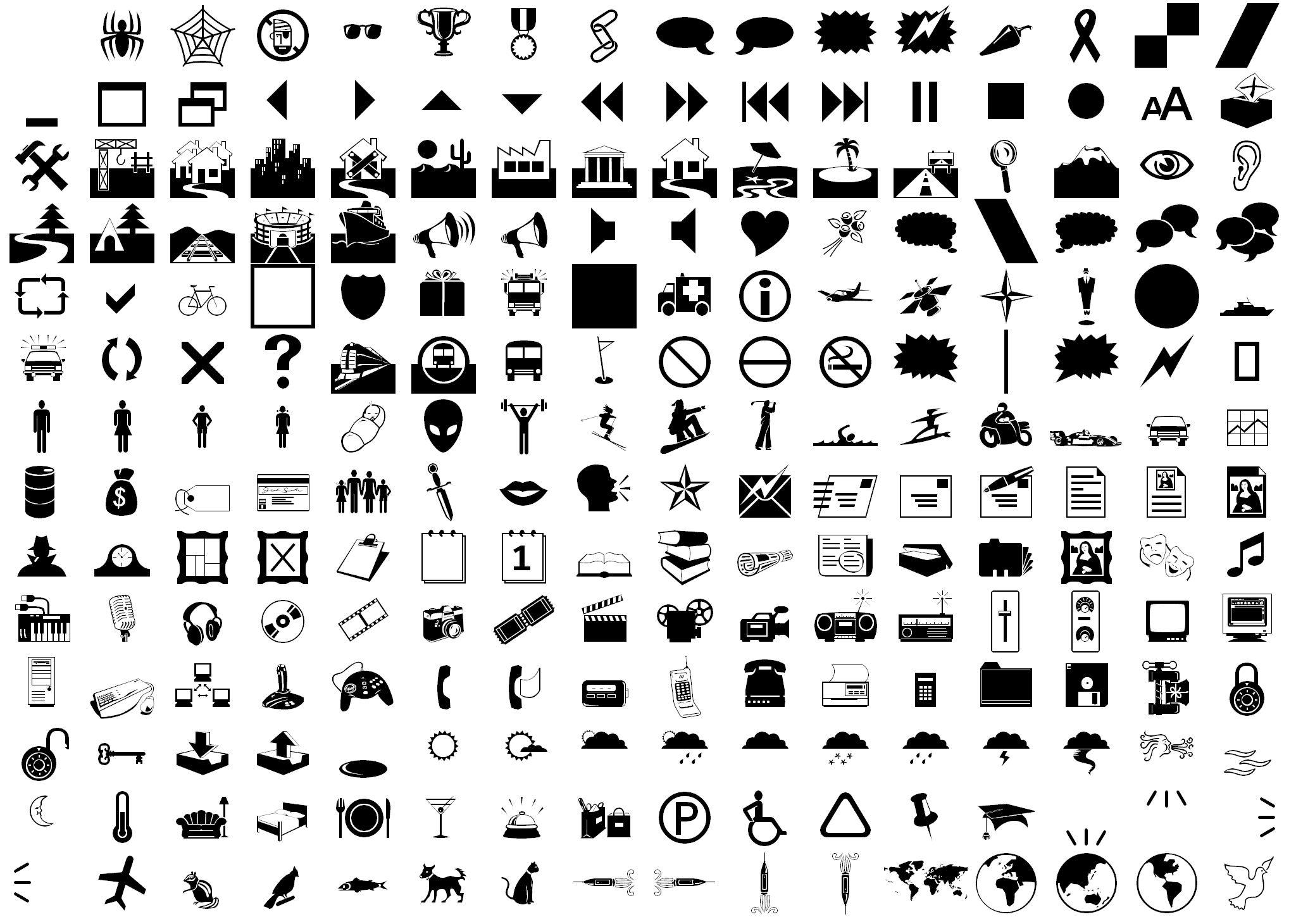
Webdings font sample showing the Webdings encoding

== Code page layout ==
The table below also shows the equivalent Unicode code point for each character.

Webdings
	0	1	2	3	4	5	6	7	8	9	A	B	C	D	E	F
0_																
1_																
2_	SP	🕷 1F577	🕸 1F578	🕲 1F572	🕶 1F576	🏆︎ 1F3C6	🎖 1F396	🖇 1F587	🗨 1F5E8	🗩 1F5E9	🗰 1F5F0	🗱 1F5F1	🌶 1F336	🎗 1F397	🙾 1F67E	🙼 1F67C
3_	🗕 1F5D5	🗖 1F5D6	🗗 1F5D7	⏴ 23F4	⏵ 23F5	⏶ 23F6	⏷ 23F7	⏪︎ 23EA	⏩︎ 23E9	⏮ 23EE	⏭ 23ED	⏸ 23F8	⏹ 23F9	⏺ 23FA	🗚 1F5DA	🗳 1F5F3
4_	🛠 1F6E0	🏗 1F3D7	🏘 1F3D8	🏙 1F3D9	🏚 1F3DA	🏜 1F3DC	🏭︎ 1F3ED	🏛 1F3DB	🏠︎ 1F3E0	🏖 1F3D6	🏝 1F3DD	🛣 1F6E3	🔍︎ 1F50D	🏔 1F3D4	👁 1F441	👂︎ 1F442
5_	🏞 1F3DE	🏕 1F3D5	🛤 1F6E4	🏟 1F3DF	🛳 1F6F3	🕬 1F56C	🕫 1F56B	🕨 1F568	🔈︎ 1F508	🎔 1F394	🎕 1F395	🗬 1F5EC	🙽 1F67D	🗭 1F5ED	🗪 1F5EA	🗫 1F5EB
6_	⮔ 2B94	✔ 2714	🚲︎ 1F6B2	⬜︎ 2B1C	🛡 1F6E1	📦︎ 1F4E6	🛱 1F6F1	⬛︎ 2B1B	🚑︎ 1F691	🛈 1F6C8	🛩 1F6E9	🛰 1F6F0	🟈 1F7C8	🕴︎ 1F574	⬤ 2B24	🛥 1F6E5
7_	🚔︎ 1F694	🗘 1F5D8	🗙 1F5D9	❓︎ 2753	🛲 1F6F2	🚇︎ 1F687	🚍︎ 1F68D	⛳︎ 26F3	⦸ 29B8	⊖ 2296	🚭︎ 1F6AD	🗮 1F5EE	⏐ 23D0	🗯 1F5EF	🗲 1F5F2	
8_	🚹︎ 1F6B9	🚺︎ 1F6BA	🛉 1F6C9	🛊 1F6CA	🚼︎ 1F6BC	👽︎ 1F47D	🏋︎ 1F3CB	⛷ 26F7	🏂︎ 1F3C2	🏌︎ 1F3CC	🏊︎ 1F3CA	🏄︎ 1F3C4	🏍 1F3CD	🏎 1F3CE	🚘︎ 1F698	🗠 1F5E0
9_	🛢 1F6E2	💰︎ 1F4B0	🏷 1F3F7	💳︎ 1F4B3	👪︎ 1F46A	🗡 1F5E1	🗢 1F5E2	🗣 1F5E3	✯ 272F	🖄 1F584	🖅 1F585	🖃 1F583	🖆 1F586	🖹 1F5B9	🖺 1F5BA	🖻 1F5BB
A_	🕵︎ 1F575	🕰 1F570	🖽 1F5BD	🖾 1F5BE	📋︎ 1F4CB	🗒 1F5D2	🗓 1F5D3	🕮 1F56E	📚︎ 1F4DA	🗞 1F5DE	🗟 1F5DF	🗃 1F5C3	🗂 1F5C2	🖼 1F5BC	🎭︎ 1F3AD	🎜 1F39C
B_	🎘 1F398	🎙 1F399	🎧︎ 1F3A7	💿︎ 1F4BF	🎞 1F39E	📷︎ 1F4F7	🎟 1F39F	🎬︎ 1F3AC	📽 1F4FD	📹︎ 1F4F9	📾 1F4FE	📻︎ 1F4FB	🎚 1F39A	🎛 1F39B	📺︎ 1F4FA	💻︎ 1F4BB
C_	🖥 1F5A5	🖦 1F5A6	🖧 1F5A7	🕹 1F579	🎮︎ 1F3AE	🕻 1F57B	🕼 1F57C	📟︎ 1F4DF	🖁 1F581	🖀 1F580	🖨 1F5A8	🖩 1F5A9	🖿 1F5BF	🖪 1F5AA	🗜 1F5DC	🔒︎ 1F512
D_	🔓︎ 1F513	🗝 1F5DD	📥︎ 1F4E5	📤︎ 1F4E4	🕳 1F573	🌣 1F323	🌤 1F324	🌥 1F325	🌦 1F326	☁ 2601	🌨 1F328	🌧 1F327	🌩 1F329	🌪 1F32A	🌬 1F32C	🌫 1F32B
E_	🌜︎ 1F31C	🌡 1F321	🛋 1F6CB	🛏 1F6CF	🍽 1F37D	🍸︎ 1F378	🛎 1F6CE	🛍 1F6CD	Ⓟ 24C5	♿︎ 267F	🛆 1F6C6	🖈 1F588	🎓︎ 1F393	🗤 1F5E4	🗥 1F5E5	🗦 1F5E6
F_	🗧 1F5E7	🛪 1F6EA	🐿 1F43F	🐦︎ 1F426	🐟︎ 1F41F	🐕︎ 1F415	🐈︎ 1F408	🙬 1F66C	🙮 1F66E	🙭 1F66D	🙯 1F66F	🗺 1F5FA	🌍︎ 1F30D	🌏︎ 1F30F	🌎︎ 1F30E	🕊 1F54A

== Vincent Connare ==
The man who created Webdings also created several other fonts including Comic Sans and Trebuchet MS. Webdings was created due to the demand of the new digital age; hence Connare was told to draft up a font that was "creative," "friendly" and "hand-drawn". Jennifer Niederst, author of "Web Design in a Nutshell: A Desktop Quick Reference," talks about Connare's work with type, including Webdings. Niederst states in her book, "These fonts have generous character spacing, large x-heights, and open, rounded features that make them better for online reading," which further comments on the kind of fonts Connare was told to create.

== Opportunities ==
People such as Karl Pentzlin have proposed that dingbat typefaces, such as Webdings, be encoded to Apple devices or more handheld devices in general. There are also organizations and individuals such as Michal Suignard who have created proposals for Webdings to be encoded in the "international character encoding standard Unicode". Both of these proposal examples also include other dingbat typefaces such as Wingdings.

Webdings has also been used to help create artwork. In the case of Pat Boas, it has been stated that in Boas's work titled, Abstraction Machine, she "began by typing 'poison' in the font called 'Webdings,'..." which helped Boas to create a painting that challenged the audience to de-code its meaning. Boas also notes how the artwork captures a dialogue between the Webdings typeface, which is based in logic, and the handpainted artwork, which is "sensuous".

== See also ==
- Core fonts for the Web
- Wingdings
