= Geometric Shapes Extended =

- Range: U+1F780..U+1F7FF (128 code points)
- Plane: SMP
- Scripts: Common
- Symbol sets: Webdings; Wingdings; Emoji
- Assigned: 120 code points
- Unused: 8 reserved code points

Unicode Version History
- 7.0 (2014): 85 (+85)
- 11.0 (2018): 89 (+4)
- 12.0 (2019): 101 (+12)
- 14.0 (2021): 102 (+1)
- 15.0 (2022): 103 (+1)
- 18.0 (2026): 120 (+17)

Unicode documentation
- Code chart ∣ Web page

Geometric Shapes Extended is a Unicode block containing Webdings/Wingdings symbols, mostly different weights of squares, crosses, and saltires, and different weights of variously spoked asterisks, stars, and various color squares and circles for emoji.

The Geometric Shapes Extended block contains thirteen emoji: U+1F7E0–U+1F7EB and U+1F7F0.

== Block ==
Geometric Shapes Extended^{[1]}^{[2]} Official Unicode Consortium code chart (PDF)
	0	1	2	3	4	5	6	7	8	9	A	B	C	D	E	F
U+1F78x	🞀	🞁	🞂	🞃	🞄	🞅	🞆	🞇	🞈	🞉	🞊	🞋	🞌	🞍	🞎	🞏
U+1F79x	🞐	🞑	🞒	🞓	🞔	🞕	🞖	🞗	🞘	🞙	🞚	🞛	🞜	🞝	🞞	🞟
U+1F7Ax	🞠	🞡	🞢	🞣	🞤	🞥	🞦	🞧	🞨	🞩	🞪	🞫	🞬	🞭	🞮	🞯
U+1F7Bx	🞰	🞱	🞲	🞳	🞴	🞵	🞶	🞷	🞸	🞹	🞺	🞻	🞼	🞽	🞾	🞿
U+1F7Cx	🟀	🟁	🟂	🟃	🟄	🟅	🟆	🟇	🟈	🟉	🟊	🟋	🟌	🟍	🟎	🟏
U+1F7Dx	🟐	🟑	🟒	🟓	🟔	🟕	🟖	🟗	🟘	🟙	🟚	🟛				
U+1F7Ex	🟠	🟡	🟢	🟣	🟤	🟥	🟦	🟧	🟨	🟩	🟪	🟫				
U+1F7Fx	🟰	🟱	🟲	🟳	🟴	🟵	🟶	🟷	🟸	🟹	🟺	🟻	🟼	🟽	🟾	🟿
Notes 1.As of Unicode version 18.0 2.Grey areas indicate non-assigned code points

== History ==
The following Unicode-related documents record the purpose and process of defining specific characters in the Geometric Shapes Extended block:

Version	Final code points (Note: Proposed code points and characters names may differ from final code points and names)	Count	L2 ID	WG2 ID	Document
7.0	U+1F780..1F7D4	85	L2/11-052R		Suignard, Michel (2011-02-15), Wingdings and Webdings symbols - Preliminary study
7.0	U+1F780..1F7D4	85	L2/11-149		Suignard, Michel (2011-05-09), Proposal to add Wingdings and Webdings symbols
7.0	U+1F780..1F7D4	85	L2/11-196	N4022	Suignard, Michel (2011-05-21), Revised Wingdings proposal
7.0	U+1F780..1F7D4	85	L2/11-247	N4115	Suignard, Michel (2011-06-08), Proposal to add Wingdings and Webdings Symbols
7.0	U+1F780..1F7D4	85	L2/11-344	N4143	Suignard, Michel (2011-09-28), Updated proposal to add Wingdings and Webdings Symbols
7.0	U+1F780..1F7D4	85		N4103	"10.2.1 Wingdings/Webdings additions", Unconfirmed minutes of WG 2 meeting 58, 2012-01-03
7.0	U+1F780..1F7D4	85	L2/12-130	N4239	Suignard, Michel (2012-05-08), Disposition of comments on SC2 N 4201 (PDAM text for Amendment 1.2 to ISO/IEC 10646 3rd edition)
7.0	U+1F780..1F7D4	85		N4363	Suignard, Michel (2012-10-13), Status of encoding of Wingdings and Webdings Symbols
7.0	U+1F780..1F7D4	85	L2/12-368	N4384	Suignard, Michel (2012-11-06), Status of encoding of Wingdings and Webdings Symbols
7.0	U+1F780..1F7D4	85	L2/12-086	N4223	Requests regarding the Wingdings/Webdings characters in ISO/IEC 10646 PDAM 1.2, 2012-12-27
11.0	U+1F7D5..1F7D8	4	L2/16-108	N4719	West, Andrew (2016-04-21), Proposal to encode symbols for Go game notation
11.0	U+1F7D5..1F7D8	4	L2/16-121		Moore, Lisa (2016-05-20), "B.11.20.1.1", UTC #147 Minutes
11.0	U+1F7D5..1F7D8	4	L2/16-185	N4719R	West, Andrew (2016-07-11), Proposal to encode symbols for Go game notation
11.0	U+1F7D5..1F7D8	4	L2/16-216		Anderson, Deborah; Whistler, Ken; McGowan, Rick; Pournader, Roozbeh; Glass, Andrew; Iancu, Laurențiu; Moore, Lisa (2016-07-30), "15. Go Notation Symbols", Recommendations to UTC #148 August 2016 on Script Proposals
11.0	U+1F7D5..1F7D8	4	L2/16-203		Moore, Lisa (2016-08-18), "E.5", UTC #148 Minutes
11.0	U+1F7D5..1F7D8	4		N4873R (pdf, doc)	"10.3.3, M65.08a", Unconfirmed minutes of WG 2 meeting 65, 2018-03-16
12.0	U+1F7E0..1F7EB	12	L2/18-141R2		Davis, Mark; et al. (2018-05-01), Emoji Colors (revised)
12.0	U+1F7E0..1F7EB	12	L2/18-143R2	N4960	Davis, Mark; et al. (2018-05-03), ESC Recommendations 2018Q2 (revised)
12.0	U+1F7E0..1F7EB	12	L2/18-115		Moore, Lisa (2018-05-09), "Consensus 155-C16 and 155-C18", UTC #155 Minutes
12.0	U+1F7E0..1F7EB	12	L2/18-191		Buff, Charlotte (2018-05-31), Comments on Emoji 12.0 Candidates
12.0	U+1F7E0..1F7EB	12	L2/18-219		West, Andrew (2018-07-11), Feedback on ESC recommendations for draft candidates for Emoji 12.0 (L2/18143R2)
12.0	U+1F7E0..1F7EB	12	L2/18-234	N5008	Everson, Michael (2018-07-18), Feedback on draft candidates for Emoji 12.0 (L2/18-143R2)
12.0	U+1F7E0..1F7EB	12	L2/18-246		Silva, Eduardo Marín (2018-07-20), Response to Andrew West on feedback on emoji submissions (L2/18-219)
12.0	U+1F7E0..1F7EB	12	L2/18-253		Davis, Mark (2018-08-21), Comments on accumulated feedback on Unicode 12.0 draft candidates
12.0	U+1F7E0..1F7EB	12	L2/18-183		Moore, Lisa (2018-11-20), "Consensus 156-C13", UTC #156 Minutes
12.0	U+1F7E0..1F7EB	12		N5020 (pdf, doc)	Umamaheswaran, V. S. (2019-01-11), "10.3.13", Unconfirmed minutes of WG 2 meeting 67
14.0	U+1F7F0	1	L2/20-225		Krenek, Christian (2019-12-31), Proposal for Emoji: Equal Sign
14.0	U+1F7F0	1	L2/20-237		Moore, Lisa (2020-10-27), "Consensus 165-C23", UTC #165 Minutes
14.0	U+1F7F0	1	L2/20-242R2		Daniel, Jennifer (2020-10-07), Recommendations for Emoji, Unicode 14.0
15.0	U+1F7D9	1	L2/17-237		Behjat, Adib; Behjat, Ayan (2017-07-05), Baha'i 9-Pointed Star Emoji Proposal Submission
15.0	U+1F7D9	1	L2/17-287		Davis, Mark; Edberg, Peter (2017-08-08), "Other emoji proposals", Recommendations from ESC for 2018, part 2, "One character originally proposed as emoji is considered more appropriate for encoding as a non-emoji symbol by the ESC. As a result, it would go through the normal process for deciding whether to encode a symbol."
15.0	U+1F7D9	1	L2/20-095		Behjat, Adib; Kiefte, Joop (2020-03-26), Proposal to add Nine Pointed star
15.0	U+1F7D9	1	L2/21-144		Behjat, Adib; Kiefte, Joop (2021-06-29), Proposal to add Nine Pointed star to Unicode
15.0	U+1F7D9	1	L2/21-144R		Behjat, Adib; Kiefte, Joop (2021-10-01), Proposal to add Nine Pointed star
15.0	U+1F7D9	1	L2/21-130		Anderson, Deborah; Whistler, Ken; Pournader, Roozbeh; Liang, Hai (2021-07-26), "21. Nine Pointed Star", Recommendations to UTC #168 July 2021 on Script Proposals
15.0	U+1F7D9	1	L2/21-123		Cummings, Craig (2021-08-03), "Consensus 168-C30", Draft Minutes of UTC Meeting 168
18.0	U+1F7DA	1	L2/24-151R		Kojitani, Gen (2024-09-23), Proposal for two geometric shapes for Japanese traditional calendars
18.0	U+1F7DA	1	L2/24-165		Lunde, Ken (2024-07-11), "16", CJK & Unihan Working Group Recommendations for UTC #180 Meeting
18.0	U+1F7DA	1	L2/24-228		Kučera, Jan; et al. (2024-11-01), "3.4 Japanese traditional calendar symbols", Recommendations to UTC #181 (November 2024) on Script Proposals
18.0	U+1F7DA	1	L2/24-221		Constable, Peter (2024-11-12), "Consensus 181-C40", UTC #181 Minutes, "Provisionally assign ... U+1F7DA BLACK CIRCLE WITH WHITE VERTICAL BAR ..."
18.0	U+1F7DA	1	L2/25-226		"Consensus 185-C40", UTC #185 Minutes, 2025-10-29, "UTC accepts for encoding in Unicode 18.0 ..."
18.0	U+1F7DB, 1F7F1..1F7FF	16	L2/25-126	N5330	Mayer, Uwe; et al. (2025-03-24), Proposal to encode 17 geometric shapes
18.0	U+1F7DB, 1F7F1..1F7FF	16	L2/25-091R		Kučera, Jan; et al. (2025-04-22), "5.13 Leibniz", Recommendations to UTC #183 (April 2025) on Script Proposals
18.0	U+1F7DB, 1F7F1..1F7FF	16	L2/25-187		Kučera, Jan; Anderson, Deborah; Pournader, Roozbeh; Constable, Peter; Goregaokar, Manish; Leroy, Robin (2025-07-18), "2.3 Geometric shapes", Recommendations to UTC #184 (July 2025) on Script Proposals
18.0	U+1F7DB, 1F7F1..1F7FF	16	L2/25-181		Leroy, Robin (2025-08-07), "Consensus 184-C19", UTC #184 Minutes, "Accept 16 code points U+1F7DB and U+1F7F1..U+1F7FF ..."

== See also ==
- Dingbat
- other Unicode blocks
  - Box Drawing
  - Block Elements
  - Geometric Shapes
  - Halfwidth and Fullwidth Forms
  - Miscellaneous Symbols and Pictographs includes several geometric shapes of different colors
  - Supplemental Arrows-C
