= Trebuchet (disambiguation) =

A trebuchet (French: trébuchet) is a siege engine used in the Middle Ages.

Trebuchet may also refer to:

- Trebuchet MS, a sans-serif typeface designed by Vincent Connare for Microsoft in 1996
- Trebuchet, the sixth album by musician George Hrab, and the ninth song on that album
- Trébuchet, a type of zugzwang in chess, a situation in which the side to move loses
- A default home screen launcher for CyanogenMod/LineageOS since CyanogenMod 9
