= OpenDyslexic =

Typeface designed for dyslexia

- Category: Sans-serif
- Designer: Abbie Gonzalez
- Date released: 2011
- License: SIL Open Font License v1.1
- Sample
- Shown here: OpenDyslexic 3 Regular
- Website: opendyslexic.org

OpenDyslexic is a free typeface and sans-serif font intended to mitigate some of the common reading errors caused by dyslexia. The typeface was created by Abbie Gonzalez, who released it through an open-source license.

Like many dyslexia-intervention typefaces, most notably Dyslexie, OpenDyslexic adds to dyslexia research and is intended as a reading aid. It is not a cure for dyslexia. The typeface includes regular, bold, italic, bold-italic, and monospaced font styles. The benefit has been questioned in scientific studies.

In 2012, Gonzalez explained their motivation to the BBC: "I had seen similar fonts, but at the time they were completely unaffordable and so impractical as far as costs go."

== Integration ==
The typeface is an optional choice on many websites and formats, including Wikipedia, (Note: In the Wikipedia skin introduced in 2023, OpenDyslexic can be used by clicking the "n languages" button in the upper-right of the page, clicking the gear icon, clicking the "Fonts" button, checking the "Download fonts when needed" box, and selecting "OpenDyslexic".) Instapaper, Kobo eReader, Amazon Kindle Paperwhite, a few children's books, and at least one imprint of classic literature.

There is also a Google Chrome extension available, which was developed by Abbie Gonzalez and Robert James Gabriel. It is also part of the "dyslexia-friendly mode" in Oswald Foundation's web accessibility products.

== Scientific studies ==
A few studies have investigated the effect of specialized fonts used with students with dyslexia. Rello and Baeza-Yates (2013) measured eye-tracking recordings of Spanish readers (aged 11–50) with dyslexia and found that OpenDyslexic did not significantly improve reading time nor shorten eye fixation. In her master's thesis, Leeuw (2010) compared Arial and Dyslexie with 21 Dutch students with dyslexia and found Dyslexie did not lead to faster reading, but may help with some dyslexic-related errors. A study (2016) by Sanne M. Kuster, Marjolijn van Weerdenburg, Marjolein Gompel, and Anna M. T. Bosman showed that when given the choice between Arial, Times New Roman, and a dyslexia-intervention typeface, people with dyslexia preferred Arial. However, a different study (2023) by Liz Broadbent of dyslexic and non-dyslexic students that directly compared Arial and OpenDyslexic showed that of the 86% participants who expressed any preference, the participants did prefer OpenDyslexic with 58% stating that was their preference. The most common given answer as to why was the aesthetics and design of the font. The study showed that there was no difference in the test scores based on which font was used.

In its Dyslexia Style Guide, the British Dyslexia Association recommends using sans-serif fonts "such as Arial and Comic Sans", where letters can appear less crowded. As alternatives, it recommends Verdana, Tahoma, Century Gothic, Trebuchet, Calibri, and Open Sans.

== Related typefaces ==
There are other typefaces and fonts that have been linked to benefits for people with dyslexia including: BBC Reith, Comic Sans, Dyslexie, FS Me, Sassoon and Sylexiad.

== See also ==
- Legibility
- Readability
- Type design

=== Other dyslexia-friendly fonts ===
- Comic Sans – Typeface by Microsoft in 1994
- Trebuchet – Humanist sans-serif typeface family
- Shantell Sans – Handwritten font designed by someone with dyslexia
