= Dyslexia =

Learning disability affecting reading

- Other names: Reading disorder
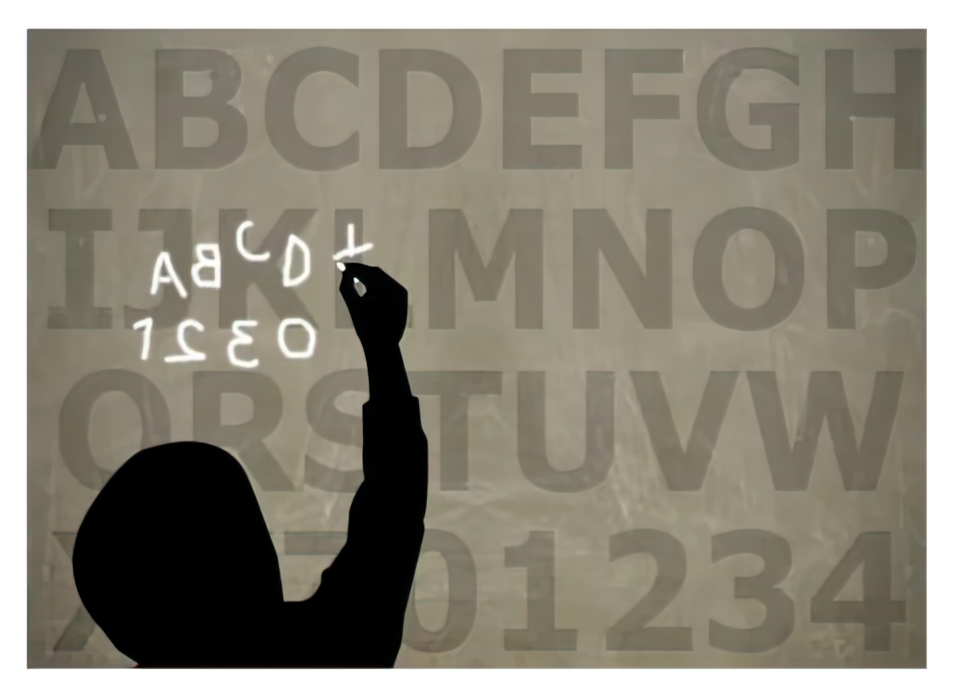
- Dyslexia involves difficulties in processing letters and words.
- Pronunciation: /dɪsˈlɛksiə/ dis-LEK-see-ə
- Specialty: Neurology, pediatrics
- Symptoms: Trouble reading
- Usual onset: School age
- Types: Surface dyslexia
- Causes: Genetic and environmental factors
- Risk factors: Family history, attention deficit hyperactivity disorder
- Diagnostic method: Series memory, spelling, vision, and reading test
- Differential diagnosis: Hearing or vision problems, insufficient teaching
- Treatment: Adjusting teaching methods
- Frequency: 3–7%

Dyslexia, also known as word blindness, is a learning disability that affects either reading, writing, or speaking. Different people are affected to different degrees. Problems may include difficulties in spelling words, reading quickly, writing words, "sounding out" words in the head, pronouncing words when reading aloud and understanding what one reads. Often these difficulties are first noticed at school. The difficulties are involuntary, and people with this disorder have a normal desire to learn. People with dyslexia have higher rates of attention deficit hyperactivity disorder (ADHD), developmental language disorders, and difficulties with numbers.

Dyslexia is believed to be caused by the interaction of genetic and environmental factors. Some cases run in families. Dyslexia that develops due to a traumatic brain injury, stroke, or dementia is sometimes called "acquired dyslexia" or alexia. The underlying mechanisms of dyslexia result from differences within the brain's language processing. Dyslexia is diagnosed through a series of tests of memory, vision, spelling, and reading skills. Dyslexia is separate from reading difficulties caused by hearing or vision problems or by insufficient teaching or opportunity to learn.

Treatment involves adjusting teaching methods to meet the person's needs. While not curing the underlying problem, it may decrease the degree or impact of symptoms. Treatments targeting vision are not effective. Dyslexia is the most common learning disability and occurs in all areas of the world. It affects 3–7% of the population; however, up to 20% of the general population may have some degree of symptoms. While dyslexia is more often diagnosed in boys, this is partly explained by a self-fulfilling referral bias among teachers and professionals. It has even been suggested that the condition affects men and women equally. Some believe that dyslexia is best considered as a different way of learning, with both benefits and downsides.

== Classification ==
Dyslexia is divided into developmental and acquired forms. Acquired dyslexia occurs subsequent to neurological insult, such as traumatic brain injury or stroke. People with acquired dyslexia exhibit some of the signs or symptoms of the developmental disorder, but require different assessment strategies and treatment approaches. Pure alexia, also known as agnosic alexia or pure word blindness, is one form of alexia which makes up "the peripheral dyslexia" group.

== Signs and symptoms ==
In early childhood, symptoms that correlate with a later diagnosis of dyslexia include delayed onset of speech and a lack of phonological awareness. A common myth closely associates dyslexia with mirror writing and reading letters or words backwards. These behaviors are seen in many children as they learn to read and write, and are not considered to be defining characteristics of dyslexia.

School-age children with dyslexia may exhibit signs of difficulty in identifying or generating rhyming words, or counting the number of syllables in words—both of which depend on phonological awareness. They may also show difficulty in segmenting words into individual sounds (such as sounding out the three sounds of k, a, and t in cat) or may struggle to blend sounds, indicating reduced phonemic awareness.

Difficulties with word retrieval or naming things is also associated with dyslexia. People with dyslexia are commonly poor spellers, a feature sometimes called dysorthographia or dysgraphia, which depends on the skill of orthographic coding.

Problems persist into adolescence and adulthood and may include difficulties with summarizing stories, memorization, reading aloud, or learning foreign languages. Adults with dyslexia can often read with good comprehension, though they tend to read more slowly than others without a learning difficulty and perform worse in spelling tests or when reading nonsense words—a measure of phonological awareness.

=== Associated conditions ===
Dyslexia often co-occurs with other learning disorders, but the reasons for this comorbidity have not been clearly identified. These associated disabilities include:

Dysgraphia
A disorder involving difficulties with writing or typing, sometimes due to problems with eye–hand coordination; it also can impede direction- or sequence-oriented processes, such as tying knots or carrying out repetitive tasks. In dyslexia, dysgraphia is often multifactorial, due to impaired letter-writing automaticity, organizational and elaborative difficulties, and impaired visual word forming, which makes it more difficult to retrieve the visual picture of words required for spelling.
Attention deficit hyperactivity disorder (ADHD)
A disorder characterized by problems sustaining attention, hyperactivity, or acting impulsively. Dyslexia and ADHD commonly occur together. Approximately 15% or 12–24% of people with dyslexia have ADHD; and up to 35% of people with ADHD have dyslexia.
Auditory processing disorder
A listening disorder that affects the ability to process auditory information. This can lead to problems with auditory memory and auditory sequencing. Many people with dyslexia have auditory processing problems, and may develop their own logographic cues to compensate for this type of deficit. Some research suggests that auditory processing skills could be the primary shortfall in dyslexia.
Developmental coordination disorder
A neurological condition characterized by difficulty in carrying out routine tasks involving balance, fine-motor control and kinesthetic coordination; difficulty in the use of speech sounds; and problems with short-term memory and organization.

== Causes ==
Inferior parietal lobule – superior view animation

Researchers have been trying to find the neurobiological basis of dyslexia since the condition was first identified in 1881. For example, some have tried to associate the common problem among people with dyslexia of not being able to see letters clearly to abnormal development of their visual nerve cells.

=== Neuroanatomy ===
Neuroimaging techniques, such as functional magnetic resonance imaging (fMRI) and positron emission tomography (PET), have shown a correlation between both functional and structural differences in the brains of children with reading difficulties. Some people with dyslexia show less activation in parts of the left hemisphere of the brain involved with reading, such as the inferior frontal gyrus, inferior parietal lobule, and the middle and ventral temporal cortex. Meta-analyses of fMRI studies have found under-activation where the temporal and occipital lobes meet in the left hemisphere in dyslexic subjects (including the visual word form area). Over the past decade, brain activation studies using PET to study language have produced a breakthrough in the understanding of the neural basis of language. Neural bases for the visual lexicon and for auditory verbal short-term memory components have been proposed, with some implication that the observed neural manifestation of developmental dyslexia is task-specific (i.e., functional rather than structural). fMRIs of people with dyslexia indicate an interactive role of the cerebellum and cerebral cortex as well as other brain structures in reading.

The cerebellar theory of dyslexia proposes that impairment of cerebellum-controlled muscle movement affects the formation of words by the tongue and facial muscles, resulting in the fluency problems that some people with dyslexia experience. The cerebellum is also involved in the automatization of some tasks, such as reading. The fact that some children with dyslexia have motor task and balance impairments could be consistent with a cerebellar role in their reading difficulties. However, the cerebellar theory has not been supported by controlled research studies.

=== Genetics ===
Research into potential genetic causes of dyslexia has its roots in post-autopsy examination of the brains of people with dyslexia. Observed anatomical differences in the language centers of such brains include microscopic cortical malformations known as ectopias, and more rarely, vascular micro-malformations, and microgyrus—a smaller than usual size for the gyrus. The previously cited studies and others suggest that abnormal cortical development, presumed to occur before or during the sixth month of fetal brain development, may have caused the abnormalities. Abnormal cell formations in people with dyslexia have also been reported in non-language cerebral and subcortical brain structures. Several genes have been associated with dyslexia, including DCDC2 and KIAA0319 on chromosome 6, and DYX1C1 on chromosome 15.

=== Gene–environment interaction ===
The contribution of gene–environment interaction to reading (dis)ability, which estimates the proportion of variance (the differences in reading ability across individuals) attributable to environmental and genetic factors, has been studied extensively by comparing sets of identical twins and fraternal twins. Such twin studies show that both environmental and genetic influences contribute to reading development, with these two influences' relative impact varying by context. For example, parental education has been found to moderate genetic influences on reading (dis)ability, and teacher quality can moderate genetic effects on early reading ability. Moreover, in more supportive environments, genetic risk factors account for a larger proportion of the variation in dyslexia. This occurs because reducing environmental risks—through high-quality instruction and supportive caregiving—lowers environmental differences, making genetic effects easier to detect. If environmental risk factors are reduced with good teaching and a supporting caregiver environment, genetic risk factors may play a bigger role in explaining why some people have dyslexia because the genetic effect is easier to detect given that much environmental noise is bracketed-out.

As environment plays a large role in learning and memory, it is likely that epigenetic modifications play an important role in reading ability. Measures of gene expression, histone modifications, and methylation in the human periphery are used to study epigenetic processes; however, all of these have limitations in the extrapolation of results for application to the human brain.

==== Language ====
The orthographic complexity of a language directly affects how difficult it is to learn to read it. English and French have comparatively "deep" phonemic orthographies within the Latin alphabet writing system, with complex structures employing spelling patterns on several levels: letter-sound correspondence, syllables, and morphemes. Languages such as Spanish, Italian and Finnish primarily employ letter-sound correspondence—so-called "shallow" orthographies—which makes them easier to learn for people with dyslexia. Logographic writing systems, such as Chinese characters, have extensive symbol use, and these also pose problems for dyslexic learners.

== Pathophysiology ==
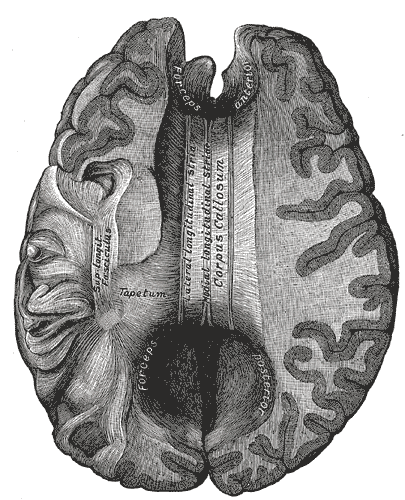
Corpus callosum view, front part at top of image

For most people who are right-hand dominant, the left hemisphere of their brain is more specialized for language processing. With regard to the mechanism of dyslexia, fMRI studies suggest that this specialization is less pronounced or absent in people with dyslexia. In other studies, dyslexia is correlated with anatomical differences in the corpus callosum, the bundle of nerve fibers that connects the left and right hemispheres.

Data via diffusion tensor MRI indicate changes in connectivity or in gray matter density in areas related to reading and language. Finally, the left inferior frontal gyrus has shown differences in phonological processing in people with dyslexia. Neurophysiological and imaging procedures are being used to ascertain phenotypic characteristics in people with dyslexia, thus identifying the effects of dyslexia-related genes.

=== Dual route theory ===
The dual-route theory of reading aloud was first described in the early 1970s. This theory suggests that two separate mental mechanisms, or cognitive routes, are involved in reading aloud. One mechanism is the lexical route, which is the process whereby skilled readers can recognize known words by sight alone, through a "dictionary" lookup procedure. The other mechanism is the nonlexical or sublexical route, which is the process whereby the reader can "sound out" a written word. This is done by identifying the word's constituent parts (letters, phonemes, graphemes) and applying knowledge of how these parts are associated with each other — for example, how a string of neighboring letters sound together. The dual-route system could explain the different rates of dyslexia occurrence between different languages (e.g., the consistency of phonological rules in the Spanish language could account for the fact that Spanish-speaking children show a higher level of performance in non-word reading, when compared to English-speakers).

== Diagnosis ==
Dyslexia is a heterogeneous, dimensional learning disorder that impairs accurate and fluent word reading and spelling. Typical—but not universal—features include difficulties with phonological awareness, inefficient and often inaccurate processing of sounds in oral language (phonological processing), and verbal working memory deficits.

Dyslexia is a neurodevelopmental disorder, subcategorized in diagnostic guides as a learning disorder with impairment in reading (ICD-11 prefixes "developmental" to "learning disorder"; DSM-5 uses "specific"). Dyslexia is not a problem with intelligence. Emotional problems often arise secondary to learning difficulties. The National Institute of Neurological Disorders and Stroke describes dyslexia as "difficulty with phonological processing (the manipulation of sounds), spelling, and/or rapid visual-verbal responding".

The British Dyslexia Association defines dyslexia as "a learning difficulty that primarily affects the skills involved in accurate and fluent word reading and spelling" and is characterized by "difficulties in phonological awareness, verbal memory and verbal processing speed". Phonological awareness enables one to identify, discriminate, remember (working memory), and mentally manipulate the sound structures of language—phonemes, onsite-rime segments, syllables, and words.

=== Assessment ===
The following can be done to assess for dyslexia:

Apply a multidisciplinary team approach involving the child's parent(s) and teacher(s), school psychologist, pediatrician, and, as appropriate, speech and language pathologist (speech therapist), and occupational therapist.

Gain familiarity with typical ages children reach various general developmental milestones, and domain-specific milestones, such as phonological awareness (recognizing rhyming words; identifying the initial sounds in words).

Do not rely on tests exclusively. Careful observation of the child in the school and home environments, and sensitive, comprehensive parental interviews are just as important as tests.

Look at the empirically supported response to intervention (RTI) approach, which "... involves monitoring the progress of a group of children through a programme of intervention rather than undertaking a static assessment of their current skills. Children with the most need are those who fail to respond to effective teaching, and they are readily identified using this approach."

==== Assessment tests ====
There is a wide range of tests that are used in clinical and educational settings to evaluate the possibility of dyslexia. If initial testing suggests that a person might have dyslexia, such tests are often followed up with a full diagnostic assessment to determine the extent and nature of the disorder. Some tests can be administered by a teacher or computer; others require specialized training and are given by psychologists. Some test results indicate how to carry out teaching strategies. Because a variety of different cognitive, behavioral, emotional, and environmental factors all could contribute to difficulty learning to read, a comprehensive evaluation should consider these different possibilities. These tests and observations can include:

- General measures of cognitive ability, such as the Wechsler Intelligence Scale for Children, Woodcock-Johnson Tests of Cognitive Abilities, or Stanford-Binet Intelligence Scales. Low general cognitive ability would make reading more difficult. Cognitive ability measures also often try to measure different cognitive processes, such as verbal ability, nonverbal and spatial reasoning, working memory, and processing speed. There are different versions of these tests for different age groups. Almost all of these require additional training to give and score correctly, and are done by psychologists. According to Mather and Schneider (2015), a confirmatory profile and/or pattern of scores on cognitive tests confirming or ruling-out reading disorder has not yet been identified.
- Screening or evaluation for mental health conditions: Parents and teachers can complete rating scales or behavior checklists to gather information about emotional and behavioral functioning for younger people. Many checklists have similar versions for parents, teachers, and younger people old enough to read reasonably well (often 11 years and older) to complete. Examples include the Behavioral Assessment System for Children, and the Strengths and Difficulties Questionnaire. All of these have nationally representative norms, making it possible to compare the level of symptoms to what would be typical for the younger person's age and biological sex. Other checklists link more specifically to psychiatric diagnoses, such as the Vanderbilt ADHD Rating Scales or the Screen for Child Anxiety Related Emotional Disorders (SCARED). Screening uses brief tools that are designed to catch cases with a disorder, but they often get false positive scores for people who do not have the disorder. Screeners should be followed up by a more accurate test or diagnostic interview as a result. Depressive disorders and anxiety disorders are two-three times higher in people with dyslexia, and attention-deficit/hyperactivity disorder is more common, as well.
- Review of academic achievement and skills: Average spelling/reading ability for a dyslexic is a percentage ranking <16, well below normal. In addition to reviewing grades and teacher notes, standardized test results are helpful in evaluating progress. These include group administered tests, such as the Iowa Tests of Educational Development, that a teacher may give to a group or whole classroom of younger people at the same time. They also could include individually administered tests of achievement, such as the Wide Range Achievement Test, or the Woodcock-Johnson (which also includes a set of achievement tests). The individually administered tests again require more specialized training.

== Screening ==
Screening procedures seek to identify children who show signs of possible dyslexia. In the preschool years, a family history of dyslexia, particularly in biological parents and siblings, predicts an eventual dyslexia diagnosis better than any test. In primary school (ages 5–7), the ideal screening procedure consists of training primary school teachers to carefully observe and record their pupils' progress through the phonics curriculum, and thereby identify children progressing slowly. When teachers identify such students they can supplement their observations with screening tests such as the Phonics screening check used by United Kingdom schools during Year 1.

In the medical setting, child and adolescent psychiatrist M. S. Thambirajah emphasizes that "[g]iven the high prevalence of developmental disorders in school-aged children, all children seen in clinics should be systematically screened for developmental disorders irrespective of the presenting problem/s." Thambirajah recommends screening for developmental disorders, including dyslexia, by conducting a brief developmental history, a preliminary psychosocial developmental examination, and obtaining a school report regarding academic and social functioning.

== Management ==
Through the use of compensation strategies, therapy and educational support, individuals with dyslexia can learn to read and write. There are techniques and technical aids that help to manage or conceal symptoms of the disorder. Reducing stress and anxiety can sometimes improve written comprehension. For dyslexia intervention with alphabet-writing systems, the fundamental aim is to increase a child's awareness of correspondences between graphemes (letters) and phonemes (sounds), and to relate these to reading and spelling by teaching how sounds blend into words. Reinforced collateral training focused on reading and spelling may yield longer-lasting gains than oral phonological training alone. Early intervention can be successful in reducing reading failure.

Research does not suggest that specially-tailored fonts (such as Dyslexie and OpenDyslexic) help with reading. In experiments, a more significant difference in reading performance was driven by interline spacing, and the difference was not significant once variables such as interline spacing and x-height were normalised between the candidate fonts. Children with dyslexia read text set in a regular font such as Times New Roman and Arial just as quickly, and they show a preference for regular fonts over specially-tailored fonts. Some research has pointed to increased letter-spacing being beneficial.

There is currently no evidence showing that music education significantly improves the reading skills of adolescents with dyslexia.

== Prognosis ==
Dyslexic children require special instruction for word analysis and spelling from an early age. The prognosis, generally speaking, is positive for individuals who are identified in childhood and receive support from friends and family. The New York educational system (NYED) indicates "a daily uninterrupted 90-minute block of instruction in reading" and "instruction in phonemic awareness, phonics, vocabulary development, reading fluency" so as to improve the individual's reading ability.

== Epidemiology ==
The prevalence of dyslexia is unknown, but it has been estimated to be as low as 5% and as high as 17% of the population. Dyslexia is diagnosed more often in males.

There are different definitions of dyslexia used throughout the world. Further, differences in writing systems may affect development of written language ability due to the interplay between auditory and written representations of phonemes. Dyslexia is not limited to difficulty in converting letters to sounds, and Chinese people with dyslexia may have difficulty converting Chinese characters into their meanings. The Chinese vocabulary uses logographic, monographic, non-alphabet writing where one character can represent an individual phoneme.

The phonological-processing hypothesis attempts to explain why dyslexia occurs in a wide variety of languages. Furthermore, the relationship between phonological capacity and reading appears to be influenced by orthography.

== History ==
Dyslexia was clinically described by Oswald Berkhan in 1881, but the term dyslexia was coined in 1883 by Rudolf Berlin, an ophthalmologist in Stuttgart. He used the term to refer to the case of a young boy who had severe difficulty learning to read and write, despite showing typical intelligence and physical abilities in all other respects. In 1896, W. Pringle Morgan, a British physician from Seaford, East Sussex, published a description of a reading-specific learning disorder in a report to the British Medical Journal titled "Congenital Word Blindness". The distinction between phonological versus surface types of dyslexia is only descriptive, and without any etiological assumption as to the underlying brain mechanisms. However, studies have alluded to potential differences due to variation in performance. Over time, the consensus has changed from an intelligence-based model to an age-based model for dyslexia .

== Society and culture ==
As is the case with any disorder, society often makes an assessment based on incomplete information. Before the 1980s, dyslexia was thought to be a consequence of education, rather than a neurological disability. As a result, society often misjudges those with the disorder. There is also sometimes a workplace stigma and negative attitude towards those with dyslexia. If the instructors of a person with dyslexia lack the necessary training to support a child with the condition, there is often a negative effect on the student's learning participation.

Since at least the 1960s in the UK, the children diagnosed with developmental dyslexia have consistently been from privileged families. Although half of prisoners in the UK have significant reading difficulties, very few have ever been evaluated for dyslexia. Access to some special educational resources and funding is contingent upon having a diagnosis of dyslexia. As a result, when Staffordshire and Warwickshire proposed in 2018 to teach reading to all children with reading difficulties, using techniques proven to be successful for most children with a diagnosis of dyslexia, without first requiring the families to obtain an official diagnosis, dyslexia advocates and parents of children with dyslexia were fearful that they were losing a privileged status.

=== Stigma and success ===
Due to the various cognitive processes that dyslexia affects and the overwhelming societal stigma around the disability, individuals with dyslexia often employ behaviors of self-stigma and perfectionistic self-presentation in order to cope with their disability. The perfectionist self-presentation is when an individual attempts to present themselves as the perfect ideal image and hides any imperfections. This behavior presents serious risk as it often results in mental health issues and refusal to seek help for their disability.

== Research ==
Writing systems

Most dyslexia research relates to alphabetic writing systems, and especially to European languages. However, substantial research is also available regarding people with dyslexia who speak Arabic, Chinese, Hebrew, or other languages. The outward expression of individuals with reading disability, and regular poor readers, is the same in some respects.

== See also ==
- Dyscalculia, difficulty comprehending numbers and math
- Learning to read
- Orton-Gillingham
- Structured literacy
- List of people with dyslexia
