= Management of dyslexia =

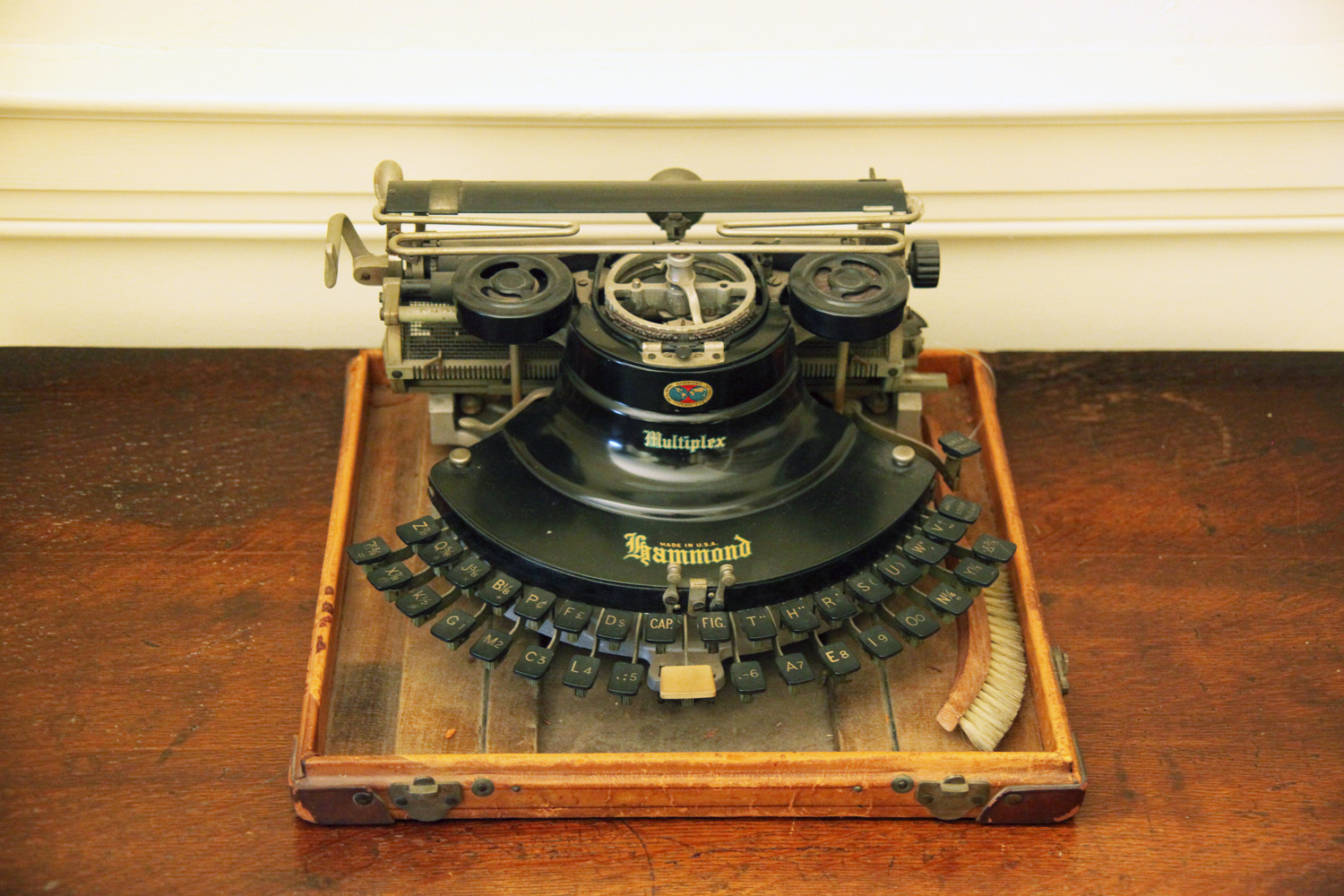
- Woodrow Wilson was an early adopter of the typewriter. It is believed to have helped him overcome dyslexia to write correspondence. Shown is Wilson's typewriter, at Woodrow Wilson House Museum.
- Specialty: Educational psychology

Management of dyslexia depends on a multitude of variables; there is no one specific strategy or set of strategies that will work for all who have dyslexia.

Some teaching is geared to specific reading skill areas, such as phonetic decoding; whereas other approaches are more comprehensive in scope, combining techniques to address basic skills along with strategies to improve comprehension and literary appreciation. Many programs are multisensory in design, meaning that instruction includes visual, auditory, and kinesthetic or tactile elements; as it is generally believed that such forms of instruction are more effective for dyslexic learners.

Several special education approaches have been developed for students with dyslexia. Adaptive technology, such as specialized computer software, has resulted in recent innovations helpful to many people with dyslexia.

One factor that characterises the field of dyslexia remediation is the stream of alternative therapies for developmental and learning disabilities. These controversial treatments include nutritional supplements, special diets, homeopathy, and osteopathy/chiropractic manipulation.

== Definition ==
Dyslexia is characterized by learning difficulties that can include:

Difficulty with oral language:

- Late in talking
- Difficulty in pronouncing words
- Difficulty in acquiring vocabulary or age appropriate grammar
- Difficulty following directions
- Confusion in right/left, before/after, top/bottom, etc.
- Difficulty in learning alphabet
- Difficulty in learning nursery rhymes or songs
- Difficulty with word retrieval or naming problems

Difficulty with reading:

- Difficulty learning to read
- Difficulty with phonological awareness (identifying rhyming words or counting syllables)
- Difficulty with phonemic awareness (hearing and manipulating sounds)
- Difficulty with auditory discrimination (distinguishing different sounds in words)
- Difficulty in learning the sounds of letters
- Difficulty remembering names
- Difficulty in remembering the orders of letters
- Misreading common words
- Omitting common words
- Guessing through longer words
- Poor reading comprehension
- Slow, laborious oral reading

Difficulty with written language:

- Trouble organizing ideas on paper
- Many spelling mistakes
- Performs well on spelling tests, but continues to have spelling mistakes in daily work
- Difficulty in proofreading

== Writing systems and orthography ==
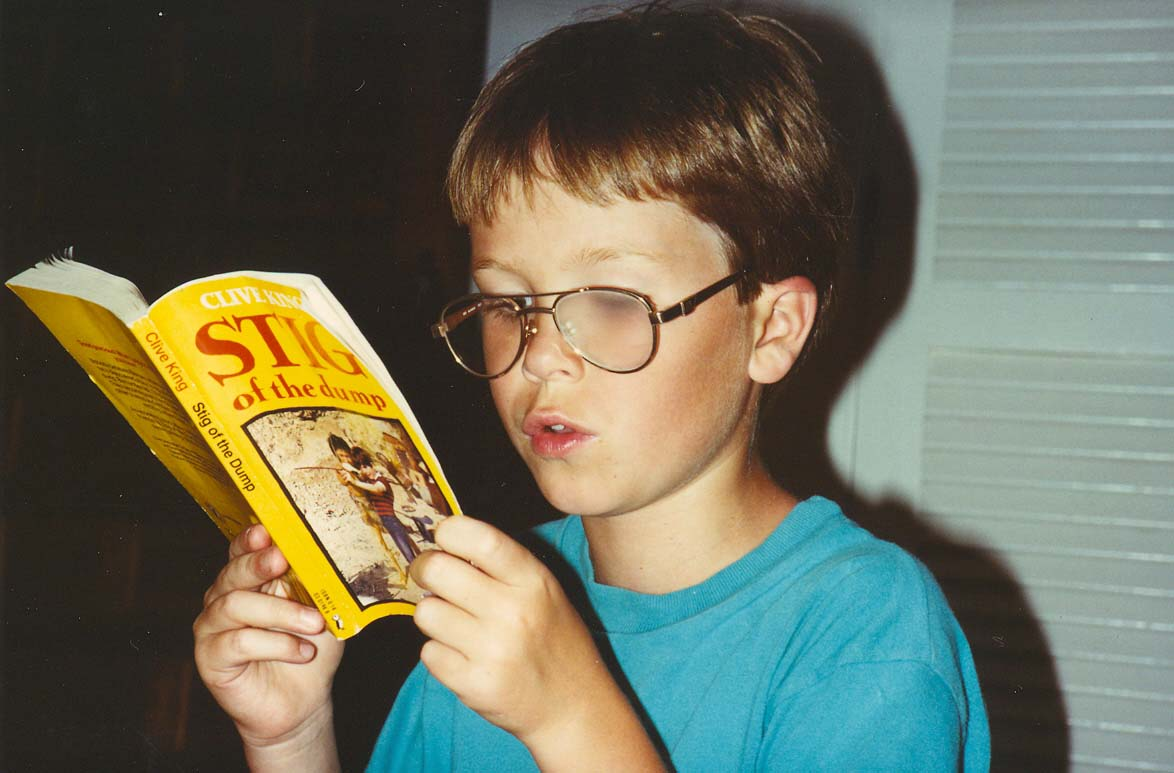
Corrective glasses are used to treat visual dyslexia.

A writing system is a type of symbolic system used to represent elements or statements expressible in language. The orthography of a language specifies the correct way of using a specific writing system to write the language. Where more than one writing system is used for a language, for example for Kurdish, there can be more than one orthography.

=== Alphabetic orthography ===
Most teaching is geared to remediating specific areas of weakness, such as addressing difficulties with phonetic decoding by providing phonics-based tutoring. Some teaching is geared to specific reading skill areas, such as phonetic decoding; whereas other approaches are more comprehensive in scope, combining techniques to address basic skills along with strategies to improve comprehension and literary appreciation. Many programs are multisensory in design, meaning that instruction includes visual, auditory, and kinesthetic or tactile elements; as it is generally believed that such forms of instruction are more effective for dyslexic learners. Despite claims of some programs to be "research based", there is very little empirical or quantitative research supporting the use of any particular approach to reading instruction as compared to another when used with dyslexic children.

Torgesen (2004) emphasized the importance of explicit instruction for remediation as well as the need for intensity that is completely different from regular classroom instruction. To make gains in reading, students need highly structured, sequential interactive activities and close monitoring, directly connecting the known with the new, with sufficient time for practice of new skills to build automaticity and fluency. The size of the instructional group is also important, ideally between 1:1 and 1:3.

== Interventions in a Latin alphabet writing system ==
There is little empirical or quantitative research supporting the use of any particular program for reading instruction when used with dyslexic children.

In 2007 the researchers Joseph Torgesen and Richard Wagner showed that, when teaching children with reading disabilities, programs including systematic and explicit instruction in phoneme awareness and grapheme-phoneme correspondence are far more successful than programs that do not.

== Academic remediations ==
With early identification and treatment is key to helping individuals with dyslexia achieve in academic and life. Appropriate remedial instruction is a structured literacy approach:

- Phonology – is the study of sound structure in the spoken word. These skills included rhyming, counting words in a spoken sentence, and clapping syllables in spike words. The ability to segment words into their compound sounds, phonemes.
- Sound-Symbol Association – once aware of phonemes of spoken language, the learner must map the phonemes to symbols (printed letters). This skill must be taught in two directions: visual to auditory (reading) and auditory to visual (spelling).
- Syllable Instruction – a syllable is a unit or written language with one vowel sound. Instructions must included the 6 basic syllable types in English (closed, vowel-consonant-e, open, consonant-le, r-controlled, and vowel pair).
- Morphology – morpheme is the smallest unit of meaning in any language. The study of base words, roots, prefixes and suffixes.
- Syntax – set of principles that dictate sequence and function of words in sentences. This concepts includes grammar, sentence variation, and mechanics of language.
- Semantics – aspect of language with focus on meaning.
- Systematic – an organization of material that follows a logical pattern of the language
- Cumulative – the steps of teaching is based on previous concepts.
- Explicit Instruction – requires the deliberate teaching of all concepts with student-teacher interactions.

The remedial structured literacy instruction can take place either in the classroom or via one-on-one reading tutoring, in either case with a trained provider. One-on-one tutoring can be hard to access due to high costs.

== Classroom accommodations ==
Although there are no treatments or quick cures for dyslexia there are many techniques that can be used to assist dyslexic students in the classroom while reading skills are being remediated. These include such things as:

- Oral testing
- Untimed tests
- Audiobooks
- Eliminate or reduce spelling tests
- Minimizing the need to read out loud
- Allow students to record the Teacher explaining homework (for example on a Dictaphone) to ensure an accurate account of the homework is made.
- Accept dictated homework
- Reduce homework load
- Grade on content, not spelling nor handwriting
- Reduce copying tasks
- Avoid or reduce essay tests
- Providing teacher handouts to supplement the notes taken
- Using materials that are not visually overcrowded
- To increase motivation, giving assignments in areas in which the student has a strong interest, for example, sports stories, biographies of inventors or rock musicians, or fiction about teenage issues.
- Use an appropriate layout, including a larger font size, larger line spacing (1.5) and a clear font – sans-serif fonts are usually recommended.
- Some dyslexic people are sensitive to the colour of the paper and may find off-white, pale green or pale purple paper can make reading easier.
- Wearing specially tinted glasses.
- Using appropriate font size. Research does not suggest that the use of specially-tailored fonts helps with dyslexia.

Individuals with dyslexia need a teacher adept at "individualized" instruction to learn to read. This need can be met in a standard classroom setting if the teacher has the experience and time to dedicate to such instruction, but the need for one-on-one instruction sometimes requires use of a private Orton-Gillingham tutor or other dyslexia tutor.

== Recent developments ==
Accessible publishing works to make reading easier for all who struggle with the standard one-size-fits-all method of book publishing. Accessible publishing works with publishers and Print on Demand technology that allows the reader to choose how the books will be published. Available format variations include choosing the font size (from 11 point font through to 28 point font), whether the font is bold, italic or regular, and choosing the amount of line spacing. There are also a variety of special fonts being developed for dyslexia, eye tracking problems and other conditions. Although some individuals with dyslexia report improved ease of reading with different fonts, these reports are anecdotal; there is little empirical evidence to support the use of "dyslexia fonts". Accessible publishers, such as ReadHowYouWant, also work to make books available in Braille, e-books, audiobooks and DAISY.

New formats such as streamline text have been developed that help dyslexic people to track (move from one line to the next) more fluently. These work by adding 'sign-posts' into the text to show where to go next.

Teachers are also using audiobooks as a way of teaching textbooks in an engaging way to those with dyslexia. In the UK, one of the biggest charities is Listening Books, which offers members a streaming service over the internet. An Australian company, ReadHowYouWant is working to make all published books available in audiobook form. In the United States, the nonprofit Learning Ally offers the world's largest library of human-narrated audio textbooks, and a second organization, Bookshare, offers a wide selection of synthetic-read audiobooks. These audiobooks work well for individuals who have word reading accuracy and fluency difficulties (i.e. dyslexics).

Individuals with dyslexia require more practice to master skills in their areas of deficit. In the circumstances where typically developing children need 30 to 60 hours training, the number of hours that has resulted in optimistic conclusions concerning the remediation of dyslexia is between 80 and 100 hours, or less if the intervention is started sufficiently early. Only approximately 20% of adults with early reading difficulties have acquired fluent reading skills in adulthood.

Functional MRI (fMRI) studies have shown neurological changes in dyslexic children and adults who have used phonological interventions, with improved performance on tests of phonemic awareness and text decoding. fMRI studies have also shown changes in the brain and spelling improvement of dyslexic children taught spelling phonetically in an orthographic manner.

A 2012 study has shown that the usage of an FM system drives neural plasticity in children with dyslexia. An FM system is a personal assistive listening device, consisting of a wireless microphone worn by the teacher, and a wireless receiver similar to a Bluetooth receiver worn on the ears by the pupil. Measurements of the brain's response to speech sounds showed that the children who wore the device for one year responded more consistently to the very soft and rapidly changing elements of sounds that help distinguish one consonant from another (cat, bat, pat etc.). That improved stability was linked with reading improvement based on standardized measures of readability—which, as a long-term benefit, points to brain plasticity.

== Typefaces ==
Some fonts can influence reading speed and accuracy for dyslexics. Some fonts have been specially designed, according to their creators, to help with reading comprehension and are specifically marketed towards those with dyslexia. Such specialized fonts include Dyslexie, OpenDyslexic, Read Regular, and Shantell Sans. However, research suggests that spacing and other accommodations have a more significant impact than the specific typeface used. Others fonts that happen to have the spacing accommodations that also help those with dyslexia.

Dyslexie was specifically designed for dyslexic readers. Renske de Leeuw found partial support that it may decrease certain kinds of reading errors, but noted the need for further research. However, two later studies concluded the font has no influence on reading speed and accuracy.

Other fonts not specially designed for dyslexia have been shown to improve reading speed and accuracy. One study found such "good fonts" are Helvetica, Courier, Arial, Verdana and Computer Modern Unicode. Additionally, they found "sans serif, roman and monospaced" fonts improved reading performance. The British Dyslexia Association recommends Arial, Comic Sans, Verdana, Tahoma, Century Gothic, and Trebuchet.

=== Free/open source fonts ===
- OpenDyslexic

=== Proprietary fonts ===
- Comic Sans

== See also ==
- Accessible publishing
- Alternative therapies for developmental and learning disabilities
- Brain training programs
- Inclusion (disability rights)
- Elkonin boxes
- Special education
- Category:Dyslexia research
- Category:Dyslexia researchers
- Category:Management of dyslexia
- Category:Education by country
