= Papyrus (typeface) =

Typeface family

- Category: Fantasy
- Designer: Chris Costello
- Foundry: Letraset
- Date created: 1982
- Date released: 1983
- Re-issuing foundries: Linotype; ITC
- Sample
- Shown here: Papyrus EF Alternatives

Papyrus is a typeface designed by Chris Costello and released by Letraset in 1983. It has a number of distinctive characteristics, including rough edges, irregular curves, and high horizontal strokes in the capitals. It is meant to emulate what a written font would have looked like when written on papyrus, which is textured and uneven.

== History and overview ==
Costello created the font in 1982, when he was 23 years old and just out of college. He had been studying the Bible and came onto the idea of what a written font would have looked like during biblical times in the Middle East. He hand-drew the font over a period of six months by means of calligraphy pen and textured paper. Costello described his goal as a font that would represent what English language texts would have looked like if written on papyrus 2,000 years ago. The font, titled Papyrus, was released by Letraset in 1983.

Papyrus has a number of distinctive characteristics, including rough edges, irregular curves, and high horizontal strokes in the capitals. ITC, the current owner of the typeface, describes it as an "unusual roman typeface [that] effectively merges the elegance of a traditional roman letterform with the hand-crafted look of highly skilled calligraphy". Costello sold the rights to the font for $750 (equivalent to $2,500 in 2025), and as of 2017, states he still receives "very low" royalty payments despite its inclusion since 1997 on all personal computers using a Mac or Windows operating system, or Microsoft Office. In any case, Costello claims "it was not my intent (for it) to be used for everything...it's way overused".

== Availability ==
Papyrus has been included in many Microsoft programs for Windows, including Microsoft Office. macOS includes the font as part of its basic installation (starting with version 10.3 Panther, released in 2003).

== Reception and use in popular culture ==
Over the years, Papyrus has gained infamy for its omnipresence in graphic design, usually in situations for which it was not intended. The criticism towards the typeface is similar to that of Comic Sans. In 2008, a website named "Papyrus Watch" was created for documenting the typeface's ubiquity and misusage.

In the webcomic xkcd, a character annoys a "typography geek" by giving her a birthday card printed in Papyrus.

Papyrus is used in the subtitles of the 2009 film Avatar, with a modified version of the font used for the film's logo. Its use in the film was highlighted in a 2017 Saturday Night Live sketch titled "Papyrus," featuring Ryan Gosling, which also claimed that it was widely used for Shakira merchandise, hookah bars, and off-brand tea companies. Jon Landau, producer of the first two Avatar films, claims that the sketch helped to keep Avatar relevant during production of the second film. In preparation for the expansion of the Avatar franchise, Avatar: The Way of Water saw the film series change to a proprietary font called Toruk; Papyrus is still used for subtitles. Following the release of The Way of Water, Gosling returned for a second SNL sketch called "Papyrus 2", in which he discovers that, despite the sequel's enormous budget, the new typeface is merely Papyrus in bold.

The 2015 indie video game Undertale features a skeleton named Papyrus, whose dialogue is written in a slightly pixelated version of the font. His brother Sans's dialogue is written in the similarly infamous Comic Sans.
