= Andalé Mono =

- Category: Monospaced
- Designer: Steve Matteson
- Foundry: Monotype Imaging, Inc.
- Date created: 1993

Andalé Mono (for technical reasons also Andale Mono) is a monospaced sans-serif typeface designed by Steve Matteson for terminal emulation and software development environments, originally for the Taligent project by Apple Inc. and IBM. Andalé Mono has a proportional-width sibling called Andalé Sans.

== IBM's legacy ==
The character set and design choices of Andalé Mono reveal its origin as a custom font for the Apple and IBM joint project Taligent. The character set includes many IBM specific symbols from IBM Courier, published in 1991. Some characters, like the card symbols, have even identical outlines. Also the dotted zero, which seems to have originated as an option on IBM 3270 displays, is included in both fonts.

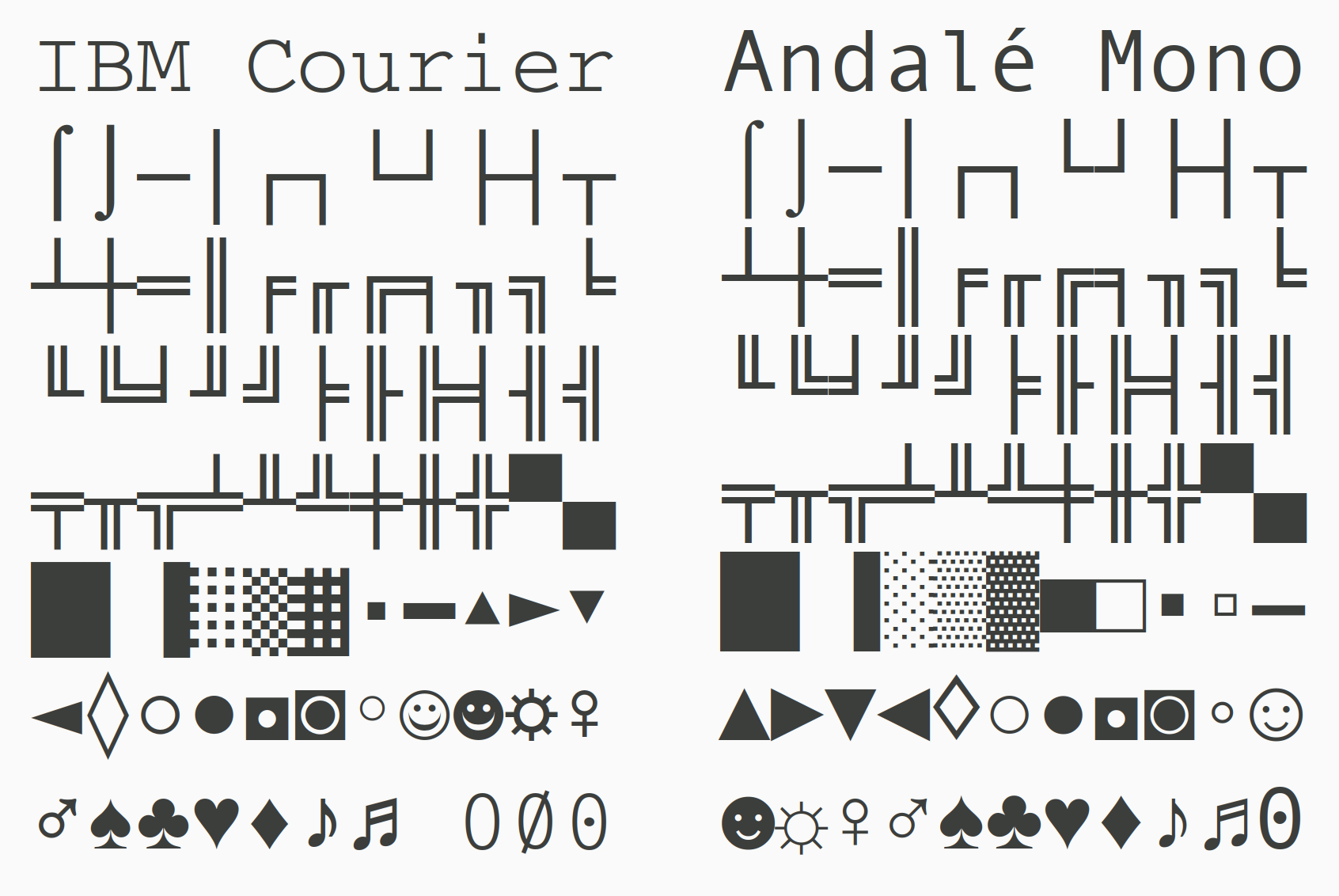

== Distribution ==
Andalé Mono was first distributed as an Internet Explorer 4.0 add-on, originally under the name Monotype.com. Starting with version 1.25 of the font, it was renamed to Andale Mono, and distributed with Internet Explorer 5 and 6. Andalé Mono is no longer distributed with modern versions of Microsoft Windows (from Windows 2000/ME onwards), having been replaced by Lucida Console. It is still available for download as part of the Core fonts for the Web package on SourceForge and it is bundled with macOS.

=== Retail versions ===
The Andale Mono typeface family sold by Ascender Corporation includes bold and italics variants, in TrueType format. This version supports the WGL character set.

Andalé Mono is also sold by Monotype, it does not include italics, and does not support Greek, Cyrillic, and most Latin Extended-A/B characters found in the Ascender version. It is available in OpenType CFF, TrueType, PostScript formats. However, Monotype has also produced language-specific variants of Andalé Mono in Cherokee (Andalé Mono Cherokee), Cyrillic (Andalé Mono Cyrillic), Greek (Andalé Mono Greek), Hebrew (Andalé Mono Hebrew) character sets.

=== Andale Mono WT ===
Andale Mono WT is a variant supporting all characters mapped by Unicode 3.0 code points. The WT stands for WorldType.

This family contains Andale Mono WT J, Andale Mono WT K, Andale Mono WT S, Andale Mono WT T, which include glyphs for Japanese, Korean, Simplified Chinese, Traditional Chinese environments, respectively. Andale Mono WTG, Andale Mono WTG Surrogate are fonts supporting Unicode 3.2 code points, with Andale Mono WTG Surrogate supporting characters outside U+FFFF code points.

Retail versions of Andale Mono WT fonts are sold under the name Unicode Font Package for SAP by Ricoh and KYOmulticode 1.0 by Kyocera. A raster version of Andale Mono WTG is shipped with FontLab Studio 5.

== See also ==
- Andalé Sans
- Core fonts for the Web
- List of typefaces included with macOS
