= TrueType core fonts for the Web =

Fonts supplied by Microsoft for canonical web use

- Products: Packaged TrueType fonts: Andalé Mono; Arial; Arial Black; Comic Sans MS; Courier New; Georgia; Impact; Times New Roman; Trebuchet MS; Verdana; Webdings
- Owner: Microsoft
- Established: 1996
- Disestablished: 2002
- Status: Defunct
- Website: microsoft.com/typography/fontpack at the Wayback Machine (archived 1999-02-18)

TrueType core fonts for the Web was a project started by Microsoft in 1996 to create a standard pack of fonts for the World Wide Web. It included the proprietary fonts Andalé Mono, Arial, Arial Black, Comic Sans MS, Courier New, Georgia, Impact, Times New Roman, Trebuchet MS, Verdana and Webdings, all of them in TrueType font format packaged in executable files (".exe") for Microsoft Windows and in BinHexed Stuff-It archives (".sit.hqx") for Macintosh. These packages were published as freeware under a proprietary license imposing some restrictions on distribution.

Microsoft terminated the project in 2002, but because of the license terms, the distributed files are still legally available from some third-party websites. Updated versions of the fonts produced since 2002 have not been published as freeware and are usually available only after purchasing a license or as a part of some commercial products.

== Overview ==
The fonts were licensed to Microsoft by Monotype Corporation or designed for Microsoft by Microsoft's own font designers or external designers. The fonts were designed to:

- Be highly legible on screen;
- Offer a wide range of typographic "timbres" within a small number of typefaces; and
- Support extensive internationalisation.

These design goals and the fonts' broad availability made some of them extremely popular with web designers. However, these proprietary fonts (or some of them) are not distributed with some modern operating systems by default (e.g. in Android, Ubuntu, FreeBSD, OpenBSD, OpenSolaris or some Symbian versions) and they are substituted by other fonts (e.g. by free software fonts, such as Liberation fonts, Ghostscript fonts, Droid fonts, DejaVu fonts and others). All of these fonts in their latest versions are installed by default in the latest versions of Mac OS X (i.e. Mac OS X 10.4 and newer), but older versions of Mac OS X did not install some of them by default (e.g. Andalé Mono, Impact) and even older versions of Mac OS also did not include many of them (e.g. Arial). Some of these fonts are also not installed by default in iOS (i.e. Andalé Mono, Comic Sans MS, Arial Black, Webdings).

While the project has formally ended, the benefits of using broadly available fonts remain: to increase the likelihood that content will be displayed in the chosen font, or in a metric-compatible alternative. Eventually, modern Web browsers added support for embedding web fonts (especially the Web Open Font Format) over the course of the 2010s, allowing the real-time downloading and display of fonts that the Web designer specified. Thus the "core fonts for the Web" became technologically obsolete, since the package was never licensed for Web embedding and a majority of websites as of 2020 use embedded Web fonts instead.

== Later history and licensing ==
The project was terminated in August 2002, allegedly because of frequent EULA violations. A Microsoft spokesman declared in 2002 that "Microsoft has also found that the downloads were being abused—repackaged, modified and shipped with commercial products in violation of the EULA." "Most users who wanted the fonts have downloaded them already." However, that same EULA allows redistribution if the packages are kept in their original format (.exe or .sit.hqx) and original filenames (e.g. times32.exe) and not used to add value to commercial products. As a result, these packages are still available for download on third-party websites under the terms of the original web fonts end user license agreement.

The EULA referenced below also requires that a copy be applied to transferees. The EULA is therefore directly linked to: for example, on the documentation page for the SourceForge "corefonts" download package. If a third party offering the fonts for download does not offer a copy of the EULA, the legal status of such a download is questionable. However, a copy of the EULA is obtainable via the FAQ maintained on Microsoft's typography website and from some other third-party websites.

For Windows, the fonts are provided as self-extracting executables (.exe); each includes an embedded cabinet file that contains a font file in TrueType format (.ttf). For the Macintosh, the files are provided as BinHexed Stuff-It archives (.sit.hqx). It is forbidden to rename, edit or create any derivative works from the executables (e.g. arial32.exe) or archives (Arial.sit.hqx), other than subsetting when embedding them in documents. The fonts can be installed and used on non-Windows or non-Macintosh operating systems, as long as they are distributed in original form (original .exe files or .sit.hqx files) and with original name (e.g. arial32.exe). A cabinet file can be extracted in an end-user's system with appropriate software, if such software is available.

The latest font-versions that were available from Microsoft's Core fonts for the Web project were 2.x (e.g. 2.82 for Arial, Times New Roman and Courier New for MS Windows), published in 2000. Later versions (such as version 3 or version 5 with many new characters) were not available from this project. A Microsoft spokesman declared in 2002 that members of the open source community "will have to find different sources for updated fonts… Although the EULA did not restrict the fonts to just Windows and Mac OS they were only ever available as Windows .exe's and Mac archive files."

In Debian and Ubuntu, the fonts are installable via a package named ttf-mscorefonts-installer in the contrib repo. This installer downloads the cabinet files and extracts them, providing an easy way for end-users to get the fonts installed in a Debian or Ubuntu environment.

Even though the fonts are available from some third-party web sites (such as an anonymous SourceForge project) and are included with Mac OS, Håkon Wium Lie (chief technical officer of Opera Software) cited the cancellation of the project as an example of Microsoft resisting interoperability.

In July 2007, Apple announced that it had renewed its licensing agreement with Microsoft for the use of the latest versions of Microsoft Windows core fonts.

== List of fonts and files ==
The TrueType core fonts for the Web project included the following files under a proprietary license:

File name	Font name	Variants	Last version	Copyright	Sample
arial32.exe	Arial for Windows 9x, NT and Windows 2000	regular, bold, italic, bold italic	version 2.82	Monotype	
Arial.sit.hqx	Arial for Apple Mac OS	regular, bold, italic, bold italic	version 2.90	Monotype	
arialb32.exe	Arial Black for Windows 9x, NT and Windows 2000	black	version 2.35	Monotype	
ariblk.exe	Arial Black for Windows 3.1 and 3.11	black	version 2.20	Monotype	
ArialBlack.sit.hqx	Arial Black for Apple Mac OS	black	version 2.35	Monotype	
andale32.exe	Andalé Mono for Windows 9x, NT and Windows 2000	regular	version 2.00	Monotype	
andalemono.sit.hqx	Andalé Mono for Apple Mac OS	regular	version 2.00	Monotype	
mtcom.exe	Monotype.com for Windows 3.1 and 3.11 (later versions released as Andalé Mono)	regular	version 1.10	Monotype	
courie32.exe	Courier New for Windows 9x, NT and Windows 2000	regular, bold, italic, bold italic	version 2.82	Monotype	
CourierNew.sit.hqx	Courier New for Apple Mac OS	regular, bold, italic, bold italic	version 2.61	Monotype	
comic32.exe	Comic Sans MS for Windows 9x, NT and Windows 2000	regular, bold	version 2.10	Microsoft	
comic.exe	Comic Sans MS for Windows 3.1 and 3.11	regular, bold	version 1.20	Microsoft	
ComicSans.sit.hqx	Comic Sans MS for Apple Mac OS	regular, bold	version 2.10	Microsoft	
georgi32.exe	Georgia for Windows 9x, NT and Windows 2000	regular, bold, italic, bold italic	version 2.05	Microsoft	
georgia.exe	Georgia for Windows 3.1 and 3.11	regular, bold, italic, bold italic	version 1.00	Microsoft	
Georgia.sit.hqx	Georgia for Apple Mac OS	regular, bold, italic, bold italic	version 2.05	Microsoft	
impact32.exe	Impact for Windows 9x, NT and Windows 2000	regular (font is actually black condensed)	version 2.35	Monotype	
impact.exe	Impact for Windows 3.1 and 3.11	regular (font is actually black condensed)	version 2.20	Monotype	
Impact.sit.hqx	Impact for Apple Mac OS	regular (font is actually black condensed)	version 2.35	Monotype	
times32.exe	Times New Roman for Windows 9x, NT and Windows 2000	regular, bold, italic, bold italic	version 2.82	Monotype	
TimesNew.sit.hqx	Times New Roman for Apple Mac OS	regular, bold, italic, bold italic	version 2.91	Monotype	
trebuc32.exe	Trebuchet MS for Windows 9x, NT and Windows 2000	regular, bold, italic, bold italic	version 1.22	Microsoft	
trebuc.exe	Trebuchet MS for Windows 3.1 and 3.11	regular, bold, italic, bold italic	version 1.00	Microsoft	
Trebuchet.sit.hqx	Trebuchet MS for Apple Mac OS	regular, bold, italic, bold italic	version 1.15	Microsoft	
verdan32.exe	Verdana for Windows 9x, NT and Windows 2000	regular, bold, italic, bold italic	version 2.35	Microsoft	
verdana.exe	Verdana for Windows 3.1 and 3.11	regular, bold, italic, bold italic	version 1.01	Microsoft	
Verdana.sit.hqx	Verdana for Apple Mac OS	regular, bold, italic, bold italic	version 2.35	Microsoft	
webdin32.exe	Webdings for Windows 9x, NT and Windows 2000	symbol	version 1.03	Microsoft	
webdings.exe	Webdings for Windows 3.1 and 3.11	symbol	version 1.01	Microsoft	

== See also ==
- Liberation fonts
- Free software Unicode typefaces
