= Marlett =

TrueType font used in Microsoft Windows since Windows 95

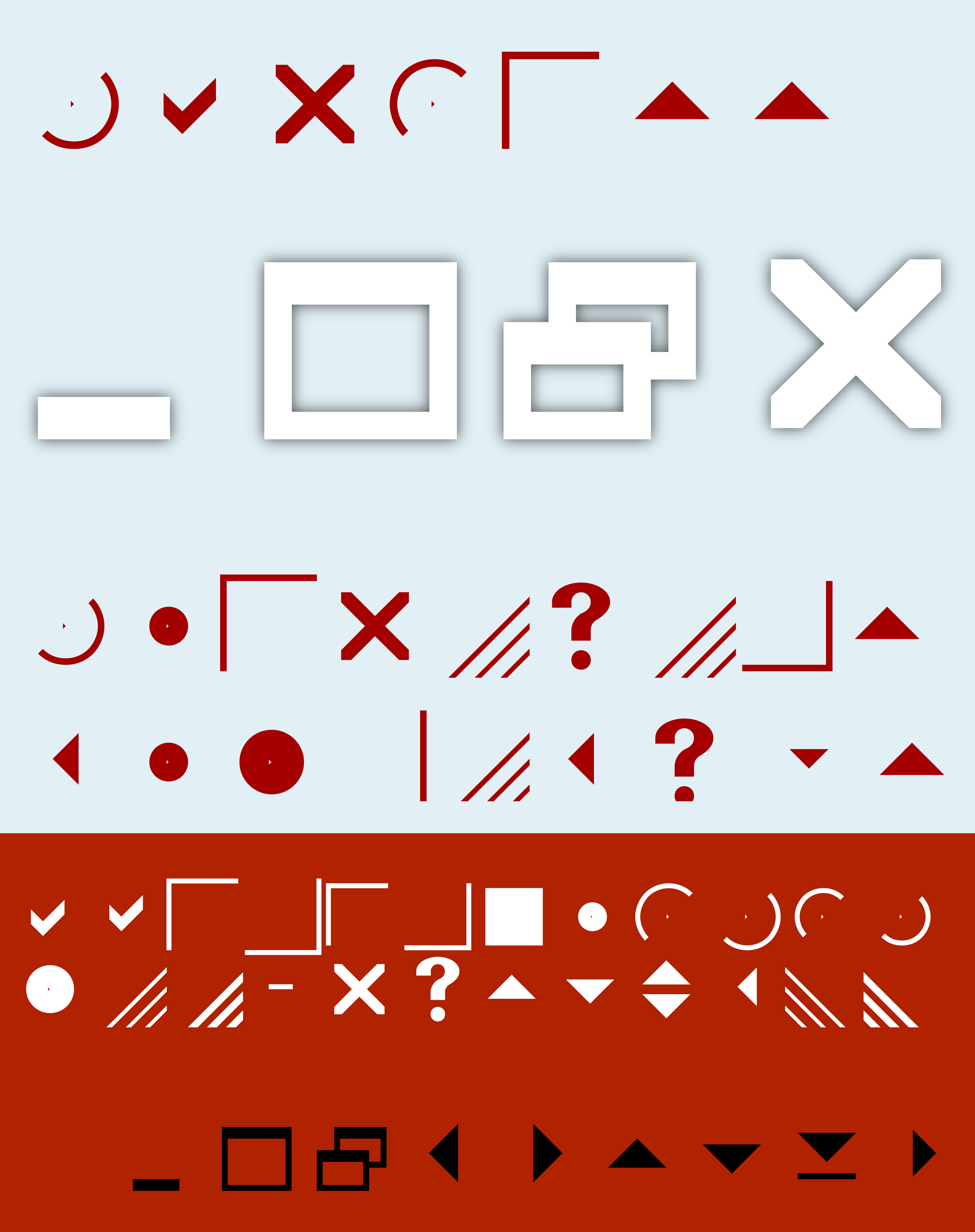
- Category: Symbol
- Designer: Virginia Howlett et al.
- Foundry: Microsoft
- Date released: 1995

Marlett
- Classification: Pi font
- Other related encoding: Webdings

Marlett is a TrueType font that has been used in Microsoft Windows since Windows 95. The operating system uses this font to create user interface icons that are used in the menus and windows. Examples are the close, maximize and minimize buttons that are made from the individual glyphs in the font. This was important to allow the users to scale the user interface and have the icons scale with the elements.

== Character layout ==
Due to the specialised nature of the Marlett glyphs, many of the mappings shown are approximate.

Marlett
	0	1	2	3	4	5	6	7	8	9	A	B	C	D	E	F
0x																
1x																
2x																
3x	🗕 (Note: Compare this position in Webdings.)	🗖	🗗	⏴	⏵	⏶	⏷	⭳ (Note: Approximate mapping: Marlett character lacks a vertical stem.)	🞂	🞃						
4x																
5x								(Note: The character 87 (hexa 0x57) represents the Windows icon, which as a corporate logo has no Unicode point. Similar Unicode characters include U+1FA9F 🪟︎ WINDOW. Compare the status of the Apple logo in Mac OS Roman and Mac OS Symbol.)								
6x		✔	✓	🭽	🭿	⎾ (Note: Approximate mapping (smaller version of 🭽))	⏌ (Note: Approximate mapping (smaller version of 🭿))	⬛︎	•	●	◜ (Note: Larger version, 180° arc on top left (mapping to quadrant arc is approximate))	◞ (Note: Larger version, 180° arc on bottom right (mapping to quadrant arc is approximate))	◜ (Note: 180° arc on top left (mapping to quadrant arc is approximate))	◞ (Note: 180° arc on bottom right (mapping to quadrant arc is approximate))	⬤	🮞
7x	🮞 (Note: Bold version)	─	🗙	❓︎	⯅	⯆	⬍	🞀	🮟	🮟						

== See also ==
- MouseText, a set of bitmapped characters used in later Apple II models for a similar function
