= Logographic cues =

Visual images embedded with specific, widely understood meaning

Logographic cues are visual images embedded with specific, widely understood meaning; they are pictures that represent certain words or concepts. These pictures are "designed to offer readers a high-utility message in a minimum amount of space."

Examples of logographic cues include traffic signs, restroom signs, and pictorial flashcards. Unsurprisingly, logographic cues tend to be processed in the right brain hemisphere, the side more actively engaged with visuospatial input. Due to advances in technology and the media where logographic cues such as brand logos abound, the ability and tendency to draw meaning from pictures has become more widespread and intuitive.

== Utility to education ==
Logographic cues have also become increasingly useful in the domain of education, specifically in the development of reading skills. Many sources of educational advice suggest the use of logographic cues to tap into visual learning and intelligence, which usually takes a subordinate role to verbal education in schools; such sources include literacy expert Kylene Beers and a nationwide reading program, All America Reads.

Specific activities that utilize logographic cues include students making symbols within the margins of print text, worksheets that provide a pictorial summary of the information given, and picture flash cards that foster vocabulary development. Teaching methods employing logographic cues can help to encourage and increase word recognition, text reformulation and information organization. The method also helps to tap into the sensory stimulation that encodes information into long-term memory.

=== Criticisms ===
The use of this method has also received some criticism. In reference to the use of logographic cues to develop word recognition the International Journal of Disability, Development and Education writes that "the results of controlled studies show it to be ineffective and potentially detrimental to student learning." The particular study documented in this journal suggested similar but modified alternatives such as Integrated Picture Cueing or the Handle Technique. The Integrated Picture Cueing (IPC) technique makes pictures out of the desired words, themselves, rather than symbolic pictorial depictions. The Handle Technique depicts the word with an extra serif (handle) that helps students encode the word and its meaning. Despite these findings and alternatives, logographic cues are widely used and encouraged in education.
