= Dyslexie =

- Category: Sans-serif
- Designer: Christian Boer
- Foundry: Dyslexie font
- Date created: 2008
- License: proprietary
- Variations: Dyslexie regular, bold, italic, italic bold
- Website: www.dyslexiefont.com

Dyslexie is a typeface and font that was designed with the intention of mitigating some of the issues that dyslexics experience when reading. As many of the twenty-six letters of the basic Latin alphabet are visually very similar, the typeface emphasizes the parts of the letter that are different from each other.

There is no evidence that the font aids reading, either in those with dyslexia or without.

== Creation ==
The typeface was designed by Dutch graphic designer Christian Boer in 2008 while he was majoring in graphic design at the University of Twente. He had himself struggled with dyslexia for much of his life.

In an interview, Boer stated that he came up with the typeface after a difficult final he was studying for. Its creation was an attempt to keep the characters from appearing to spin around, a symptom often reported in dyslexics. Boer related this to the way most people think in words: dyslexics cannot stop seeing letters differently just as non-dyslexic people cannot stop thinking in words.

== Font ==
Dyslexie uses a heavier line thickness to emphasize the bottom of most characters. This is to try to 'anchor' the letters since some people with dyslexia may see letters either moving or in three dimensions. Since dyslexics tend to get b, d, p, and q mixed up, it also emphasizes a slight slant downwards on the curvature of the letters. Letters such as c or e may gape slightly more, or slump slightly in one direction. Also, in letters such as n or h, the font slightly elongates or diminishes the stem on the letters. So the letter h would have a longer line, and n would have a lower line. In addition, the font also thickens or bolds capital letters and punctuations, so that it is easier to identify when a sentence starts or ends.

== Research ==
Research does not suggest that the font is beneficial in aiding reading. Neither children with or without dyslexia read faster or more accurately with the font. It was also not the preferred font of the children tested. Data suggested that the font a child prefers is probably the most effective for them.

No research to date has found a statistically significant beneficial effect on reading for dyslexics from any font specifically designed for dyslexia.

== See also ==
- Atkinson Hyperlegible
- Dyslexia interventions
- OpenDyslexic
