= Andalé Sans =

Humanist sans-serif typeface

- Category: Sans-serif
- Classification: Humanist
- Designer(s): Steve Matteson
- Foundry: Monotype Imaging, Inc.
- Date created: 1995

Andalé Sans (usually appearing as Andale Sans) is a proportional sans-serif typeface designed by Steve Matteson to complement its monospaced counterpart, Andalé Mono.

== Use ==
Andalé Sans was used in the high-end feature phones produced by Sony Ericsson (usually under the metadata name "Sans-Serif Europe" or "Universal").

A variant of this typeface, Andalé Sans UI, was used in the user interface of older versions of the StarOffice and OpenOffice.org (until version 2.0) suites.

A Unicode version, Ascender Uni, comprising more than 50,000 glyphs is also available from Ascender Corporation.

Andalé Sans and Andalé Sans UI were bundled with StarOffice 7, which can be still obtained on mirror sites.

== See also ==
- Andalé Mono
