= Thomas Rickner =

American type designer (born 1966)

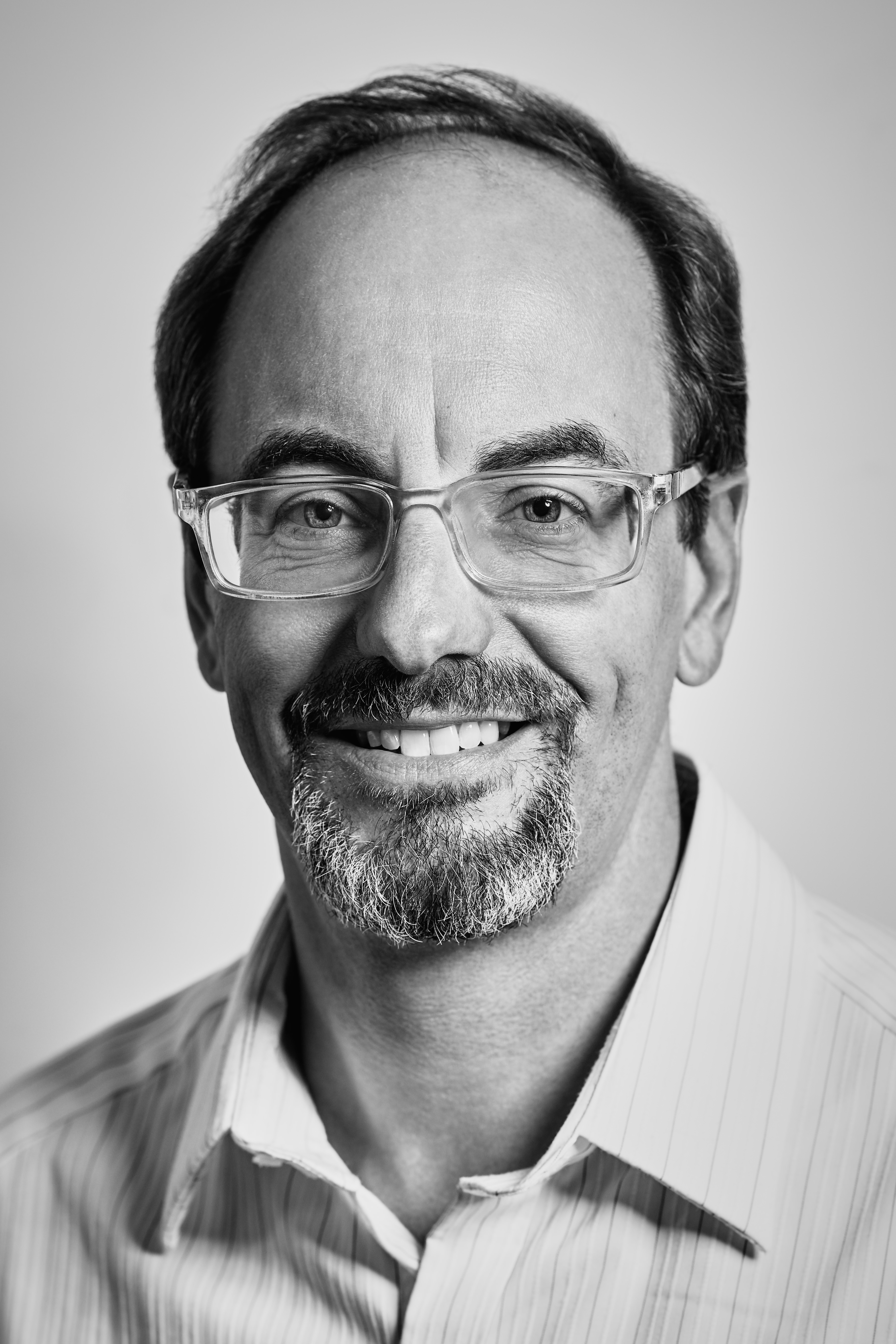
Thomas Rickner, 2018

Thomas Rickner (born October 8, 1966, Rochester, New York) is an American type designer who, while Lead Typographer at Apple Inc., supervised the production of the first TrueType fonts released in 1991 as part of Apple’s System 7 operating system for the Macintosh. Rickner provided TrueType production and font hinting of Matthew Carter’s Georgia, Verdana, and Tahoma typeface families, commissioned by Microsoft and widely distributed in the Windows operating system and Apple’s Mac OS X. Rickner’s original type designs include Amanda, Buffalo Gal and Hamilton.

Rickner began his career in type design in 1987 as a bitmap editor for Omnipage Corporation, of Rochester, New York. In 1988, he was graduated from the Rochester Institute of Technology School of Printing Management and Sciences with a bachelor's degree, and started at QMS/Imagen Corporation, a laser printer manufacturer in Santa Clara, California. There, under the direction of noted type designer Charles Bigelow, Rickner worked in the production and hand font hinting for laser printers.

In 1989, Rickner began working for Apple, Inc., where he served as Lead Typographer for two years. In addition to supervising production of the first TrueType fonts released by Apple, Rickner also worked on the early development of TrueType GX.

In 1992, Rickner began freelance type design work for The Font Bureau, Inc. collaborating on the development of several projects, including the Graphite and Tekton Multiple master fonts for Adobe Systems and a revival and expansion of William Addison Dwiggins’ Eldorado family for Premiere Magazine.

Rickner joined Monotype Corporation in July 1994, and in 2004, became a founding partner of Ascender Corporation in Elk Grove Village, Illinois. Rickner is developing fonts for the Ascender Compact Asian Font format (ACAF), and has designed fonts for the Greek, Cyrillic, Hebrew, Thai, Thaana and Cherokee scripts, among others.

Most recently, Rickner was involved in the development of Microsoft’s ClearType font collection and spent nearly two years engineering the Japanese font Meiryo included with Windows Vista.

== See also ==
- Ascender Corporation
- Font hinting
- Monotype Corporation
- TrueType
- Verdana
