= Miller (typeface) =

Typeface

- Category: Serif
- Classification: Scotch Roman
- Designers: Matthew Carter; Cyrus Highsmith; Tobias Frere-Jones; Richard Lipton
- Foundry: Font Bureau; Carter & Cone
- Date released: 1997 (Text/Display); 2002 (Daily/Headline); 2010 (Banner)
- Variations: Miller Text (shown); Miller Display; Miller Banner; Miller Headline; Miller Daily

Miller is a serif typeface, released in 1997 by the Font Bureau, a U.S.-based digital type foundry. It was designed by Matthew Carter and is of the 'transitional' style from around 1800, based on the "Scotch Roman" type which originates from types sold by Scottish type foundries that later became popular in the United States. It is named for William Miller, founder of the long-lasting Miller & Richard type foundry of Edinburgh.

The general purpose versions of Miller are Miller Text and the Miller Display optical size for display printing, though since their release they have given rise to a number of variants, including Miller Daily, Miller Headline and Miller Banner, as well as some variants commissioned for use in specific publications. The Miller family is widely used, mostly in newspapers and magazines.

Miller is closely related to Carter's previous Scotch Roman revival, the very popular Georgia family for Microsoft. Carter had been working on plans for what became Miller when contacted by Microsoft but put them temporarily on hold to work on Georgia, which is adapted to digital display. Font Bureau in marketing have called Miller "the debonair cousin of Georgia".

Miller was one of 23 typefaces included in MoMA's first acquisition of historically significant typefaces.

== Background ==
The Miller family was designed by Matthew Carter and developed with the assistance of the Font Bureau's Tobias Frere-Jones and Cyrus Highsmith, and the encouragement of James Mosley, a librarian at the St Bride Library of the history of printing in London.

Miller is a "Scotch Roman"—a style which originated in types sold by Scottish type foundries of Alexander Wilson and William Miller in the period of 1810–1820. According to Thomas Curson Hansard these were mostly cut by punchcutter Richard Austin of London. This attribution is accepted by Austin's biographer Alastair Johnston (Hansard was writing in 1825, during Austin's lifetime) although Mosley had earlier expressed caution on the attribution.

Although Miller remains faithful to the Scotch Roman style, it is not based on any single historical example. The flat-topped lowercase "t" is not original to Miller's or Wilson's types, but a "wrong font" Didone sort introduced later — possibly by mistake — that became entrenched in the style in the latter half of the 19th century. Certain other letters, such as the lowercase "k" and the Text cut's default capital "R", are drawn from other faces cut by Richard Austin, such as his type for John Bell. Mosley described Carter's revival of Miller as follows:

Matthew Carter's Miller is not a facsimile of Miller's Scotch Roman, any more than his Galliard was a facsimile of any one type by Robert Granjon. What it has done is to capture the good color, and the generous breadth and modelling of its model, and to bring a valid version of 'Scotch Roman' back into current use after a lapse [in England] of some decades. Miller was made with current production needs in mind, of which the two versions, 'Display' and the more robust 'Text' versions are evidence, and so is its relatively large x-height.

Speaking in 2013 about the development of Georgia and Miller, Carter said, "I was familiar with Scotch Romans, puzzled by the fact that they were once so popular...and then they disappeared completely." Carter as a companion digitised a Greek typeface based on British printing of the same period, based on the spare Porson typeface cut (in this case certainly) by Richard Austin and based on the handwriting of British classicist Richard Porson. Miller's default numerals are historically appropriate "hybrid" or "semi-lining" figures, slightly shorter than upper-case and in some cases descending below the baseline, although alternative more conventional full-height lining or text figures styles are offered.

== Variants ==
As well as the general purpose versions of Miller, Miller Text and Miller Display, numerous variants designed by Carter and others have been added to the Miller family. Variants include:

- Miller Daily is an expanded series of Miller News, an adaptation of Miller designed by Carter for The Guardian. It was released by the Font Bureau in 2002 alongside the Miller Headline series.
- Miller Headline was designed by Carter and Highsmith specifically for use in newspaper headlines. It was released by the Font Bureau in 2002 with the Miller Daily series.
- Miller Banner was designed by Richard Lipton for use in large settings, over 100 points. It has sharper hairlines and softer contrast.

== Usage ==
Miller and its variants are widely used in newspapers, magazines and other publications around the world. Miller Daily is used for body copy in The Washington Post, while Miller Banner features in Glamour magazine. Another Miller variant, Miller News, was commissioned by Simon Esterson of The Guardian for his 1998 redesign of the newspaper, Miller Globe was designed for The Boston Globe, and Bibliographical Miller was commissioned by the University of California, Los Angeles for use in its Aldine Press incunable collection. The Miller family has also been used in the National Post, The Straits Times, The Dallas Morning News, Hindustan Times and the San Jose Mercury News.

A 2005 survey by Ascender Corporation found Miller to be the tenth most popular typeface featured in American newspapers. As of 2010, it is Carter's biggest source of royalties amongst the fonts to which he owns the rights.
