= Bell Centennial =

Neo-grotesque sans-serif typeface

- Category: Sans-serif
- Classification: Grotesque
- Designer: Matthew Carter
- Commissioned by: AT&T
- Foundry: Mergenthaler Linotype
- Date created: 1975–1978
- Date released: 1978

Weights of the Bell Centennial typeface are named for their applications in setting telephone directories.

Ink traps are designed to anticipate ink spread on uncoated paper at smaller point sizes. The ink traps fill in, leaving the characters' counterforms open and preserving legibility.

Bell Centennial is a sans-serif typeface in the industrial or grotesque style designed by Matthew Carter in the period 1975–1978. The typeface was commissioned by AT&T as a proprietary type to replace their then current directory typeface Bell Gothic on the occasion of AT&T's one hundredth anniversary. Carter was working for the Mergenthaler Linotype Company, which now licenses the face for general public use.

== Design ==
AT&T's brief called for a typeface that would fit substantially more characters per line without loss of legibility, dramatically reducing the need for abbreviations and two-line entries, increase legibility at the smaller point sizes used in a telephone directory, and reduce consumption of paper. Bell Centennial was designed to address and overcome most of the limitations of telephone directory printing: poor reproduction due to high-speed printing on newsprint, and ink spread which decayed legibility as it closed up counterforms. Carter's design increased the x-height of lowercase characters, slightly condensed the character width, and carved out many more open counters and bowls to increase legibility. To anticipate and blunt the degradation caused by ink spread, Carter drew the letters with deep ink traps, designed to fill in as the ink spread onto newsprint fiber, leaving the characters' counterforms open and legible at small point sizes.

Printed in the smaller point sizes used in telephone directories, the ink traps are not visible, having done their job; filling in and smoothing out the character stroke. However at larger point sizes, and on coated paper stock there is not enough ink spread to fill in the traps and the shapes of the traps remain noticeable.

Bell Centennial is an example of a typeface designed to address a particular need, much like Chauncey H. Griffith's Bell Gothic (AT&T's earlier telephone directory face); Adrian Frutiger's Frutiger, designed for signage at Charles De Gaulle Airport; or Erik Spiekermann's FF Meta Sans commissioned by the Deutsche Bundespost (the German federal post office), but not adopted. Bell Centennial is only one of several typefaces Carter designed to address specific technical limitations, including CRT Gothic (1974), Video (1977), Georgia (1996), and Verdana (1996).

== Variants and weight system ==
Bell Centennial's weight system differs from other faces in that weights are named for their specific uses in AT&T's telephone directories. The lightest weight, used for addresses, is called Bell Centennial Address; a slightly heavier book weight is called Bell Centennial Caption; a demibold weight, used for the entry name and telephone number, is called Bell Centennial Name and Number. A heavier bold weight, drawn as large and small capitals without a true lowercase, is called Bell Centennial Bold Listing. This nomenclature, while simplifying telephone book setting, perplexed some new users once the typeface family was released for general use by the Linotype foundry.

== Visual distinctive characteristics ==
Characteristics of this typeface are:

- tall x-height
- prominent ink traps
- square dot over the letter i
- double-storey a; single-storey g
- narrow t and f
- dropped horizontal element on A
- horizontal top serif of 1
