= Virginia Howlett =

Canadian artist and designer

Virginia Howlett (born 1951 in Edmonton, Alberta) is a designer and painter.

With an MFA in Painting from The Art Institute of Chicago, Howlett was one of the first designers hired into Microsoft in 1985. After writing an email to Bill Gates explaining the necessity for having designated graphic user interface designers, she built the company's first user interface design team. She led the team that designed the 3D graphic interface for Windows 95. She was also instrumental in starting Microsoft's corporate art collection.

Working in Microsoft's typography group, she collaborated with Matthew Carter to develop a number of typefaces including Verdana (which is named after her daughter, Ana).

In 1996 her book Visual Interface Design for Windows was published. In it, she explains the design process and provides a number of makeovers of real-world software products. It is recognized as one of the first books to bridge the gap between artistic product designers and technical software engineers.

After retiring from Microsoft she returned to painting. She maintains a studio in San Diego and exhibits work throughout the United States.
