= Meiryo =

Series of Japanese typeface

- Category: Sans-serif
- Designers: C&G Inc., Eiichi Kōno, Takeharu Suzuki (Katakana, Hiragana, and Kanji), Matthew Carter, Tom Rickner (Latin, Greek, and Cyrillic)
- Foundry: Microsoft Typography
- Date released: 2008
- Trademark: Meiryo is either a registered trademark or a trademark of Microsoft Corporation in the United States and other countries.

Meiryo (メイリオ, Meirio) is a Japanese sans-serif gothic typeface. Microsoft bundled Meiryo with Office Mac 2008 as part of the standard install, and it replaces MS Gothic as the default system font on Japanese systems beginning with Windows Vista.

Meiryo was created out of a growing need for legible CJK fonts compatible with Microsoft ClearType's hinting and subpixel rendering system. It was meant to increase the legibility of Japanese text on LCD screens, and would thus take the place of MS Gothic and MS Mincho, both of which had been widely used at the time. While most Latin fonts were able to use hinting at any size, most CJK fonts were incompatible with the technology (with the exception of some fonts such as Arial Unicode MS). Meiryo did away with embedding bitmap images into fonts for use at small sizes, a strategy employed by many CJK fonts (including MS Gothic and MS Mincho) to compensate for a lack of hinting support.

== Etymology ==
The font name comes from the Japanese word meiryō (明瞭) [meːɾʲoː], which means "clarity", referring to ClearType making text written in Meiryo appear clearer on the screen. The Japanese spelling メイリオ is taken from the English pronunciation /ˈmeɪri.oʊ/; the actual Japanese spelling in katakana is メイリョウ.

According to Eiichi Kōno, the name was chosen for its exotic-sounding pronunciation and its compactness.

Although it is a proportional font, the font name does not contain a 'P' to indicate this in Windows font lists, as with MS P Gothic (MS Pゴシック) and MS P Minchō (MS P明朝).

== Meiryo UI ==
Meiryo ( ) compared to Meiryo UI ( )

Meiryo UI is a version that uses condensed kana and reduced line height compared to Meiryo, introduced with Windows 7 and is also available as an update in Windows Vista. Similar to MS UI Gothic, the Meiryo UI fonts are bundled with the same Meiryo TTC files of respective weights.

== Characteristics ==
Meiryo was designed as the enhanced version of Verdana, regarded as a highly readable font. The font's baseline was raised slightly to improve readability when mixing Latin and CJK texts. Meiryo glyphs for kanji and kana also have a height-to-width ratio of 95:100.

In previous Japanese fonts distributed with Windows, embedded bitmap glyphs are used whenever font size is set to around 9 points. Unlike previous fonts designed for CJK environments, Meiryo contains no embedded bitmaps. To improve readability under small font sizes without using embedded bitmaps, TrueType hinting language was used for stroke-reduction. A similar technology was used on MingLiU and PMingLiU versions 5.03.

Meiryo is developed to comply with JIS X 0213:2004 and can also use the newest set of personal name characters provided by the Japanese Minister of Justice. In addition, it contains OpenType tables for conversions between the old and new character forms (kyūjitai and shinjitai) introduced in the JIS78, JIS83, and JIS90 standards.

Meiryo supports the following OpenType layout features for Cyrillic, Greek, Han Ideographic, Kana, Latin scripts: nalt, afrc, dnom, dlig, frac, fwid, hwid, hkna, ital, jp78, jp83, jp90, numr, qwid, ruby, sinf, zero, smcp, c2sc, liga, sups, twid, vkna, vrt2, vert, kern.

Meiryo also contains glyphs not normally accessible without a font editor. These glyphs include circled 00, 51–100; negative circled 00, 21–100, a–z, A–Z, kana; (rounded) square-enclosed characters, negative (rounded) square-enclosed characters; 2x2 CJK words.

The italic version of Meiryo only provides italicized glyphs for the Latin alphabet as written Japanese has no concept of an italic font.

== Availability ==
For Microsoft Windows, Meiryo is distributed as two TrueType Collection files, with regular and bold glyphs stored in separate files. Each file also contains an italic variant of the font.

As stated earlier, the font has been included with all Windows versions since Vista.

For Windows XP, the font has become available free of charge by obtaining the Japanese version of Microsoft Visual C# 2008 Express Edition and electing to install the Microsoft Silverlight runtime. Downloading and installing the Japanese ClearType fonts for Windows XP from Microsoft also makes Meiryo available on Windows XP.

Meiryo is also distributed with Japanese version of Microsoft Office 2008 for Mac, Microsoft Office 2010 and Microsoft Office 2013.

== Authors ==
The Japanese characters of Meiryo were designed by C&G Inc. and Eiichi Kōno, who also redesigned the Johnston font which is now used by London Underground as New Johnston. The Latin characters were designed by Matthew Carter, the British-born creator of the Verdana font, and are visibly similar to characters from Verdana. By having a font designed by a combination of Japanese and Latin font experts, Microsoft strived to create a font in which written English and Japanese could present themselves well together side by side on the screen. American Tom Rickner of Ascender Corporation did extensive programming and font hinting for Meiryo. Rickner helped create the first TrueType fonts at Apple and did all the font hinting for Microsoft's Georgia and Verdana fonts. According to Rickner, Meiryo is one of the first Japanese fonts created on and for the computer screen and took two years to create and engineer.

== Problems ==
- At small sizes, dimensions of printed kanji characters are not even. However, small-size kanji rendering has been traditionally problematic involving trade-offs in legibility and other factors like spacing. That was fixed in Meiryo version 6 included with Windows 7.
- Sized between 11 and 13 points (96 dpi), glyphs have inconsistent stroke weight without the activation of ClearType. Sometimes, especially on the Mac OS X and Linux platforms, these problems can sometimes be avoided by displaying fonts in semi-bold or bold as their normal (lightest) font weight.
- At small sizes, stroke reduction is not consistent with the methods used by other fonts such as MS Gothic.
- Because of its compliance with Japanese Industrial Standard for encoding JIS X 0213:2004, variant characters have different stroke layouts from the ones used in older MS Gothic and other conventional fonts. To use older characters in a web page, for example, Meiryo needs to be activated manually. (MingLiU and PMingLiU version 5.03 follow the standards set by Taiwan's Ministry of Education and the reference rendering used in Unicode documents, which also causes similar dissatisfaction among users. On the other hand, MS Gothic, MS PGothic, MS UI Gothic, MS Mincho, MS PMincho can be updated to version 5.00, which include JIS X 0213:2004 support to match the characters used in Meiryo, and also incorporated JIS90 Forms OpenType Layout Table for users preferring the old glyphs. For Vista users, Microsoft also offered an update to make MS Gothic and MS Mincho font families to use characters in JIS X 0208-1990.)
- When italicized, only Latin characters are slanted, not CJK characters and kana. CJK characters use other methods of emphasis or quotation indication; thus differing from, for example, the typefaces of Romance languages (unrelated distinctions between cursive and non-cursive and other traditional writing styles do exist). Nowadays, however, italicization is used in advertising but usually combined with other, common forms of emphasis, such as bold weight, exclamation marks, and, in Japanese, katakana use. Academic texts, for example, do not use italicized CJK characters as opposed to those in non-CJK languages, e.g. in traditionally Latin-1 encoded European languages that use italics for things like inline quotations. Since these traditions of italicization do not exist in CJK, the decisions made for Meiryo is based on the existing general use. According to Microsoft, Meiryo uses a customized version of Verdana for italics instead of the generic slanting method. Although the font includes an OpenType table for italics, this feature only substitutes characters already included in the font, instead of applying transformation effects to the affected characters. Since Meiryo only has italic characters for Latin, Greek, Coptic, and Cyrillic characters, it is an indication that Windows Vista does not use emulated italic effects if it uses a substitute font for italic effect but cannot find the correct glyph in the italic font. Similarly, most of the OpenType tables used in the font (except kern) only work if substitute glyphs are available inside the font.
- Characters for triple and quadruple dash box-drawing characters all have six dashes. Furthermore, all horizontal dash box-drawing characters have three dashes when using OpenType's half-width features.

== Awards ==
Tokyo Type Directors club awarded 2007 Type design prize to Eiichi Kōno, C&G Inc (Satoru Akamoto, Takeharu Suzuki, Yukiko Ueda), and Matthew Carter for the Meiryo font.

== See also ==
- List of CJK fonts
