= Bitstream Charter =

Serif typeface by Matthew Carter in 1987

- Category: Serif
- Classification: Transitional serif Slab-Serif
- Designer: Matthew Carter
- Foundry: Bitstream Inc.
- Date created: 1987
- License: Permissive for original version; proprietary for "Charter BT" version

Bitstream Charter is a serif typeface designed by Matthew Carter in 1987 for Bitstream Inc. Charter is based on Pierre-Simon Fournier’s characters, originating from the 18th century. Classified by Bitstream as a transitional-serif typeface (Bitstream Transitional 801), it also has features of a slab-serif typeface and is often classified as such.

Charter was originally optimized for printing on the low-resolution 300 dpi laser printers of the 1980s, and remains suitable for printing on both modern high-resolution laser printers and inexpensive lower resolution inkjet printers due to its strong, legible design. Its structure was optimised for low-memory computers and printers. In a 2013 interview, Carter explained that it used "a very simplified structure and a minimum number of curves, more straight-line segments... very economical compared to, say, Times New Roman," but noted that rapid development of printers made this unnecessary even before he had finished the design. In its simplification of serif forms, it foreshadowed Carter's later landmark design, Georgia for Microsoft.

In 1992 Bitstream donated a version of Charter, along with its version of Courier, to the X Consortium under terms that allowed the font to be modified and redistributed. This has resulted in open source derivatives of Bitstream Charter, including Charis SIL. Typographer Matthew Butterick considers Bitstream Charter to be one of the best free fonts available.

Because of its popularity, a new Charter Pro release of the typeface was released in 2004, with an expanded character set including additional symbols, ranging figures (old-style) and small capitals. This version was later added as a system font on OS X 10.13 High Sierra.

Carter was later asked by Monotype to consider releasing a sans-serif companion to Charter. Finding his attempts unsatisfying, he scrapped the idea for a more radical, less directly complementary design, Carter Sans.

== History ==
Charter is based on the characters of Pierre-Simon Fournier, a French 18th century punch-cutter, typefounder and typographic theoretician who invented the “point system”, a standardized measurement system for font sizes.

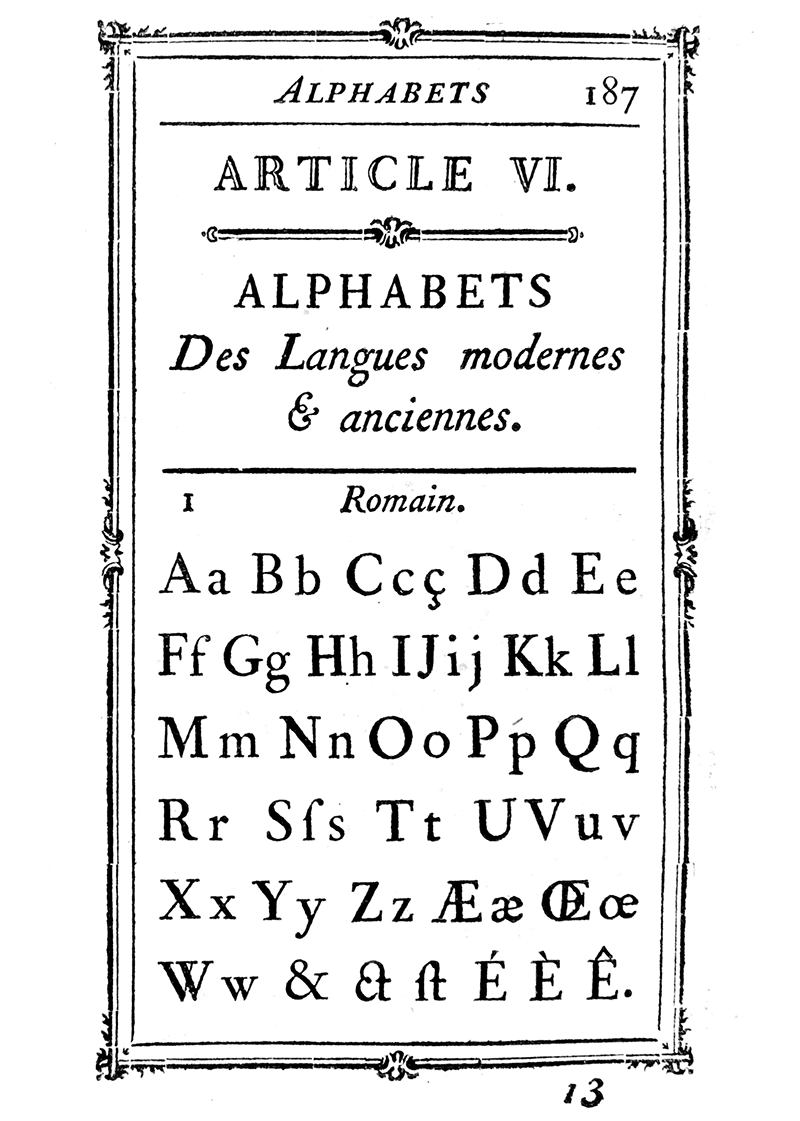
Type sample (Pierre Simon Fournier, Manuel Typographique, 1766)
