= IKEA Catalogue =

Catalogue formerly published by IKEA

Cover of the 2015 edition catalogue (Australia)

The IKEA Catalogue (US spelling: IKEA Catalog; Swedish: Ikea-katalogen) was a catalogue published annually by the Swedish home furnishing retailer IKEA. First published in Swedish in 1951, the catalogue was considered to be the main marketing tool of the company and, as of 2004, consumed 70% of its annual marketing budget. Approximately 208 million copies of the catalogue were printed in fiscal year 2013, more than double the number of Bibles expected to be printed in the same period.

The first IKEA catalogue was published in 1951 in Sweden. The 68-page catalogue was distributed in Sweden in 285,000 copies. At its peak in 2016, 200 million copies of the catalogue were distributed, in 69 different versions and 32 languages, to more than 50 countries.

In December 2020, IKEA announced that, after a 70-year run, they would end publication of the catalogue, with the 2021 edition being the final edition.

== Production and distribution ==
Containing over 300 pages and about 12,000 products, it was distributed by mail, in stores and online. Each edition of the catalogue took about 10 months to develop from concept to final product. Many different versions of the catalogue were created to reflect regional differences in product ranges as well as cultural differences. For example, photographs in the China edition depicted a smaller kitchen than the US edition.

Most of the catalogue was produced by IKEA Communications AB in Älmhult, Sweden, the site of the original IKEA store and where IKEA Communications operates the largest photo studio in northern Europe (8,000 square meters in size). As of 2012, the studio employed 285 photographers, carpenters, interior designers and other personnel working full-time on photo shoots.

In 2017, IKEA worked with five paper suppliers and 31 printers around the world to produce the catalogue each year. The catalogue itself was printed on chlorine-free paper of 10-15% post-consumer waste.

According to Canadian broadcaster CTV, "IKEA's publications have developed an almost cult-like following online. Readers have found all kinds of strange tidbits, including mysterious cat pictures, apparent Mickey Mouse references and weird books wedged into the many shelves that clutter the catalogues."

In December 2020, IKEA announced that they would be cease publication of both the print and digital versions of the catalogue, with the 2021 edition (released in 2020) being the final edition. The company said the catalogue had become less important as IKEA embraced new ways of connecting with customers. 40 million copies of the 2021 edition were printed.

== Innovation ==
The company began experimenting with computer-generated imagery in 2005 by placing a single computer-rendered image of a wooden chair in the 2006 edition of the catalogue. According to Anneli Sjögren, head of photography at IKEA, customers did not notice that the chair was computer-generated. In 2010, the first entirely computer-generated room was created for the catalogue. By the 2013 edition, 12% of imagery for the IKEA catalogue, brochures and website was computer-generated. As of 2014, 75% of product images (i.e. white background images) and 35% of non-product images across all IKEA communications are fully computer-generated.

Augmented reality was introduced in the 2013 edition of the catalogue. "X-ray" views through furniture compartments, videos, how-to guides and other interactive content could be accessed by scanning a symbol on the catalogue with a mobile device. The 2014 catalogue contains an augmented reality app that projects an item into a real-time photograph image of the user's room. The augmented reality app also provides an indication of the scale of IKEA objects in relation to the user's living environment.

== Typeface ==
In 2009, IKEA changed the typeface used in its catalogue from Futura to Verdana, expressing a desire to unify its branding between print and web media. The change drew considerable media attention. The controversy has been attributed to the perception of Verdana as a symbol of homogeneity in popular typography. In 2019, the company switched from Verdana to IKEA Noto Sans as its official corporate typeface, including its catalogue. The typeface is a modified version of Google's open-source font Noto Sans.

== Criticism ==
In October 2012, IKEA was criticised for removing women from photos in the Saudi Arabian version of the catalogue.

== IKEA Family Live ==
IKEA also publishes and sells a regular style magazine, IKEA Family Live, in thirteen languages, which supplements the catalogue. An English-language edition for the United Kingdom was launched February 2007 with a subscription of over 500,000.

== List of editions ==
- Australia (English)
- Austria (German)
- Belgium (Dutch)
- Belgium (French)
- Bulgaria (Bulgarian)
- Canada (English)
- Canada (French)
- China (Chinese)
- Czech Republic (Czech)
- Cyprus (English)
- Denmark (Danish)
- Dominican Republic (Spanish)
- Finland (Finnish)
- France (French)
- Germany (German)
- Greece and Cyprus (Greek)
- Hong Kong (Chinese)
- Hong Kong (English)
- Hungary (Hungarian)
- India (English)
- Iceland
- Indonesia (Indonesian)
- Israel (Hebrew)
- Italy (Italian)
- Japan (Japanese)
- Kuwait (Arabic)
- Kuwait (English)
- Netherlands (Dutch)
- Norway (Norwegian)
- Malaysia (English)
- Poland (Polish)
- Portugal (Portuguese)
- Romania (Romanian)
- Russia (Russian)
- Singapore (English)
- Slovakia (Slovak)
- Spain (Basque)
- Spain (Catalan)
- Spain (English)
- Spain (Spanish)
- Spain (Galician)
- Saudi Arabia (Arabic)
- Saudi Arabia (English)
- South Korea (Korean)
- Sweden (Finnish)
- Sweden (Swedish)
- Switzerland (French)
- Switzerland (German)
- Switzerland (Italian)
- Taiwan (Chinese)
- Thailand (English)
- Thailand (Thai)
- Turkey (Turkish)
- United Arab Emirates (English)
- United Kingdom (English)
- United States (English)
- United States (Spanish)
