= Monticello (typeface) =

Monticello is a typeface, a transitional, based upon the Roman Pica no. 1 foundry type made by the American type foundry Binny & Ronaldson in the 1790s. It is considered the first typeface designed and manufactured in the United States. American Type Founders Co. issued a version, based on the original molds, named Oxford. In 1949, Linotype Corporation issued a Monticello typeface for hot metal machine composition for the published edition of The Papers of Thomas Jefferson. A digital version, also named Monticello, was issued in 2003 by Matthew Carter for the Jefferson Papers. Jefferson knew and corresponded with James Ronaldson.
