= Tahoma (typeface) =

Humanist sans-serif typeface

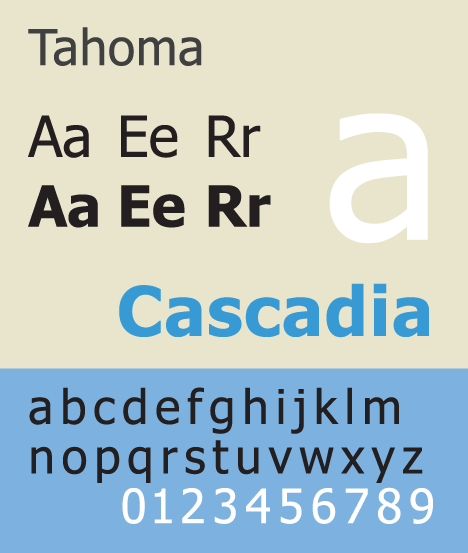
- Category: Sans-serif
- Classification: Humanist
- Designer: Matthew Carter
- Foundry: Microsoft
- Date released: 1994
- Variations: Nina

Tahoma is a humanist sans-serif typeface that Matthew Carter designed for Microsoft. Microsoft first distributed it, along with Carter's Verdana, as a computer font with Office 97.

While similar to Verdana, Tahoma has a narrower body, smaller counters, much tighter letter spacing, and a more complete Unicode character set. Carter first designed Tahoma as a bitmap font, then "carefully wrapped" TrueType outlines around those bitmaps. Carter based the bold weight on a double pixel width, rendering it closer to a heavy or black weight. In contrast with some other sans-serif typefaces, including Arial, the uppercase "I" (i) is distinguishable from lowercase "l" (L), which is especially important in technical publications. Since 2010, Ascender Corporation has offered italic and small caps versions of Tahoma.

In an interview by Daniel Will-Harris, Carter acknowledged that Tahoma has some similarities with his earlier Bell Centennial typeface.

The Tahoma typeface family was named after the Native American name for the stratovolcano Mount Rainier (Mount Tahoma), which is a prominent feature of the southern landscape around the Seattle metropolitan area.

== Bundling ==
Tahoma was an official font supplied with Office 97, Office 2000, and Office XP, and was freely distributed with Word Viewer 97.

Tahoma was the default screen font used by Windows 2000, Windows XP, and Windows Server 2003 (replacing MS Sans Serif) and was also used for Skype and Sega's Dreamcast packaging and promotional material. Bundled in the font library of Windows, the typeface was widely used as an alternative to Arial. Tahoma was also the default screen font of Windows Vista, Windows Server 2008, Windows 7 and Windows Server 2008 R2 when using the Windows Classic theme.

In 2007, Apple announced that Tahoma would be bundled with the next version of Mac OS X v10.5 ("Leopard"). Leopard also shipped with several other previously Microsoft-only fonts, including Microsoft Sans Serif, Arial Unicode, and Wingdings.

As of 2016, Tahoma is still widely in use as a standard in multiple applications and programming environments. For example, any new Delphi VCL application uses Tahoma as its default font.

== Free replacement ==
The Wine project includes the free and open-source fonts Wine Tahoma Regular and Wine Tahoma Bold released under GNU Lesser General Public License designed to have identical metrics to the Tahoma font. This was done because Tahoma is available by default on Windows, and many applications expect the font to be available. Before Wine included a Tahoma replacement font, some applications, such as Steam, would not display any text at all, rendering them nearly unusable.
