= Ink trap =

Typeface design

Ink traps in Matthew Carter's Bell Centennial. The ink traps would be much less visible on the printed page.

An ink trap is a feature of certain typefaces designed for printing in small sizes. At an ink trap, the corners or details are removed from the letterforms. When the type is printed, ink naturally spreads into the removed area. Without ink traps, the excess ink would soak outward and ruin the crisp edge.

Ink traps are only needed for small point sizes and are usually only found on typefaces designed for printing on newsprint. Fonts of this kind are applicable for classifieds or telephone books. Typefaces with ink traps may be offered in versions without them for display on screen or at larger sizes.

Typefaces featuring ink traps include Retina (original MicroPlus variant), Bell Centennial, Tang and K2D.

Related to ink traps are light traps, which aim to improve the display of letterforms against the halation of cathode ray tube (CRT) displays. Light traps were developed in the late 1960s under the direction of Rudi Bass at the Graphic Arts Department of CBS News. To improve the legibility of the text in CBS's on-screen graphics, the department produced CBS News 36, a typeface with holes at the corners of the letterforms for light to bleed into.
