= Albertus (typeface) =

Glyphic serif display typeface

Monotype Albertus
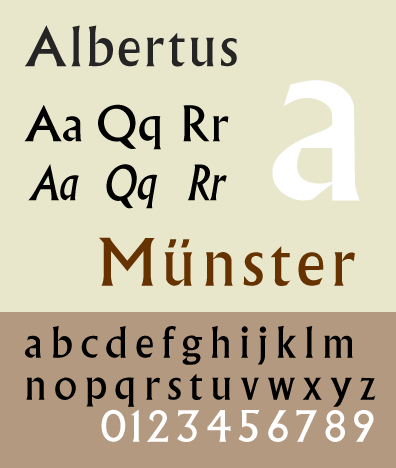
- Category: Serif
- Classification: Glyphic
- Designer: Berthold Wolpe
- Commissioned by: Stanley Morison
- Foundry: Monotype Corporation
- Date created: 1932
- Variations: Pegasus

Albertus is a glyphic serif display typeface designed by Berthold Wolpe in the period 1932 to 1940 for the British branch of the printing company Monotype. Wolpe named the font after Albertus Magnus, the thirteenth-century German philosopher and theologian.

Wolpe studied as a metal engraver, and Albertus was modelled to resemble letters carved into bronze. The face began as titling capitals. Eventually a lowercase roman was added, and later a strongly cursive, narrow italic. Albertus has slight glyphic serifs. It is available in light and italic varieties.

The project began in 1932. Titling caps were released first, and the Monotype Recorder of summer 1935 presented the capitals as an advance showing. Other characters and a lower case were added by 1940. Albertus has remained popular since its release and since the end of mass use of metal type phototypesetting and digital versions have been released.

== Characteristics ==
- In the uppercase "M" the middle strokes descend only partway, not reaching the baseline, in the default version.
- The uppercase "U" has a stem on the right side.
- Figures are lining.

In the metal type period, Albertus was offered with alternative characters, including a non-descending 'J' that stops at the baseline, an 'M' that reaches the baseline, and a different ampersand, similar to that used on Dwiggins' Metro.

Wolpe later designed Pegasus, a spiky serif design intended to complement Albertus with more body text-oriented proportions. It was less popular and had faded in popularity by the end of the metal type period, although Matthew Carter digitised it and added a bold and italic in 1980 as part of a commemorative exhibition project on Wolpe's work.

== Use ==
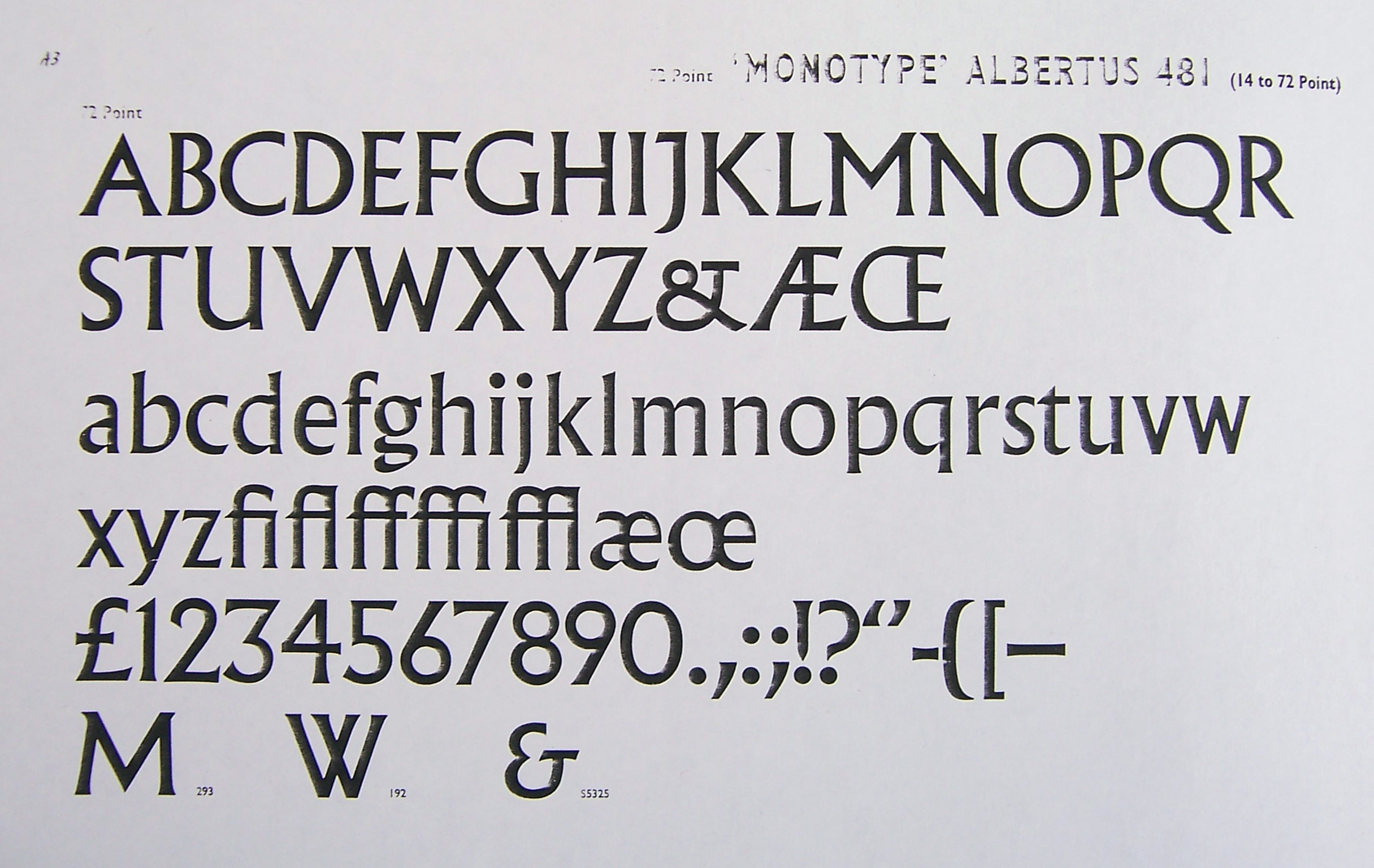
A metal-type specimen for Albertus, showing three alternative characters: a variant "M", "W" and ampersand.

A variation on Albertus has been used for the street name signs in the City of London since 1988. London Borough of Lambeth (where Wolpe resided until his death in 1989) also use it. Wolpe frequently used it in book jackets he designed for the London publisher Faber and Faber. It has also been used in many other publications.

Outside of publications an adapted version of Albertus is particularly known for its use in surreal British television series The Prisoner (1967–68), where it was used for all signage in the show's unusual prison setting (an Italianate village), as well as for the series' logo. The key adaptations were the removal of the dots from 'i's and 'j's and an uncial-style 'e'. It is also known for its use by director John Carpenter in the opening credits of several of his films.

== Digitisations ==
Monotype released an updated digital version of Albertus, named Albertus Nova, in 2017. It was digitised by Toshi Omagari as part of a Berthold Wolpe Collection series that included Pegasus and three other Wolpe typefaces. Monotype promoted the digitisation with an exhibition at the Type Museum in London. Omagari added a number of alternates, including metal type alternates, an 'A' based on Wolpe's lettering and an uncial 'e' used in the production design of The Prisoner.

Monotype's previous digital version is also available and Albertus digitisations have also been sold by Adobe, Bitstream, Fontsite, SoftMaker and others. Bitstream's version is called Flareserif 821.

URW++ released a lookalike version known as A028 for free for use with Ghostscript and TeX. Featuring medium and extra-bold weights but no italics, A028 is widely available on Linux systems and other open source environments.

== See also ==
- Carter Sans (2011), by Matthew Carter and influenced by Albertus
- Friz Quadrata (1965), a similar font
