= Verdana =

Humanist sans-serif typeface

- Category: Sans-serif
- Classification: Humanist
- Designer: Matthew Carter
- Foundry: Microsoft
- Date released: 1996
- Re-issuing foundries: Font Bureau
- Design based on: Tahoma
- Variations: Meiryo; MS Reference Sans Serif; Nina; Verdana Pro; Verdana Ref

Verdana is a humanist sans-serif typeface designed by Matthew Carter for Microsoft, with hand-hinting done by Thomas Rickner, then at Monotype. Demand for such a typeface was recognized by Virginia Howlett of Microsoft's typography group and commissioned by Steve Ballmer. The name "Verdana" is derived from "verdant" (green) and "Ana" (the name of Howlett's eldest daughter).

Bearing similarities to humanist sans-serif typefaces such as Frutiger, Verdana was designed to be readable at small sizes on the low-resolution computer screens of the period. Like many designs of this type, Verdana has a large x-height (tall lower-case characters), with wider proportions and looser letter-spacing than on print-orientated designs like Helvetica. The counters and apertures are wide, to keep strokes clearly separate from one another, and similarly shaped letters are designed to appear clearly different to increase legibility for body text. The bold weight is thicker than would be normal with fonts for print use, suiting the limitations of onscreen display. Carter has described spacing as an area he particularly worked on during the design process.

== Distinctive visual identifiable characteristics ==
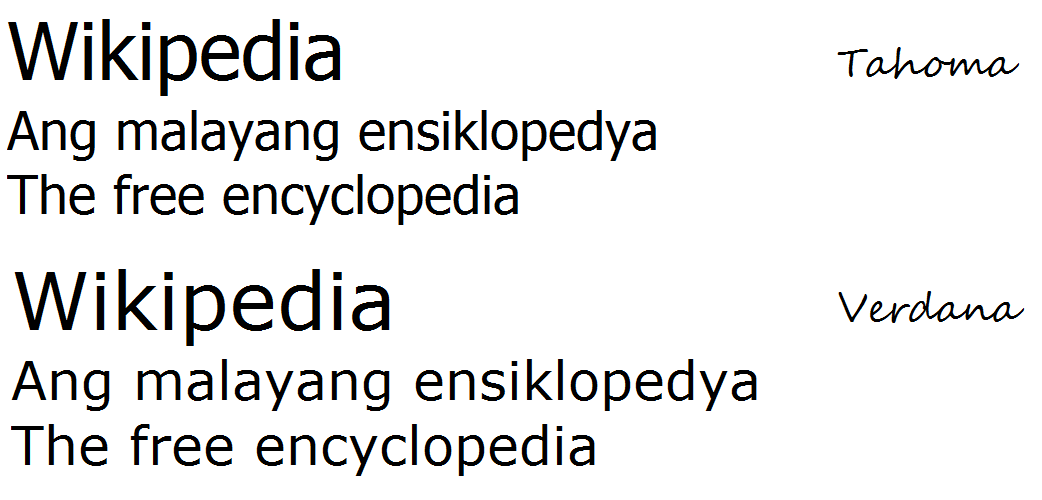
A comparison of Tahoma and Verdana

Some characteristics of the typeface are as follows:

Letter	Characteristic
i	square dot
j	serif protruding left
a	double story
Q	tail is centered
J	serif protruding left
I	two serifs on the top and bottom

As an example of the approach of making similar characters easily distinguishable, the digit (one) in Verdana was given a horizontal base and a hook in the upper left to distinguish it from lowercase l (l) and uppercase I (I). This is similar to the digit "1" found in Morris Fuller Benton's sans-serif typefaces News Gothic and Franklin Gothic.

== Prevalence ==
Released in 1996, Verdana was bundled with subsequent versions of the Windows operating system, as well as their Office and Internet Explorer software on Windows, classic Mac OS, and Mac OS X. Since at least Mac OS X 10.4, it is also bundled with the Mac OS itself. In addition, up until 2002 it was available for download from Microsoft's web site as freeware (".exe" files for Microsoft Windows and in ".sit.hqx" archives for Mac OS) under a proprietary license imposing some restrictions on usage and distribution, allowing it to be used by end users in any system supporting installation of "exe" or ".sit.hqx" files and supporting TrueType fonts. The downloadable files are still available legally from third-party web sites; see the External links section. However, these files include only old versions of Verdana, and updated versions are not available as freeware.

According to a 2013 survey, the availability of Verdana was 99.90% on Windows, 99.26% on Mac OS, and 70.02% on free operating systems like Linux.

According to a study of online fonts by the Software Usability and Research Laboratory at Wichita State University, participants preferred Verdana as the best overall font choice, and it was also perceived as being among the most legible fonts. However, Microsoft's font manager, Bill Hill, wrote that "with its large x-height and very generous spacing, it never felt comfortable as an eBook font". He noted that Microsoft had commissioned an alternative version of the pre-existing typefaces Berling and Frutiger for its Microsoft Reader e-book product. Despite this, Verdana was initially used as one of the bundled book-reading fonts on the iPad before an update in 2011.

== Microsoft variants ==
Verdana Ref is a custom version of Verdana for use with Microsoft Reference. It is used in Microsoft Bookshelf 2000, Encarta Encyclopedia Deluxe 99, Encarta Virtual Globe 99, Office 2000 Premium, and Publisher 2000. MS Reference Sans Serif is a derivative of Verdana Ref with bold and italic fonts. This font family is included with Microsoft Encarta.

Tahoma is similar to Verdana but with tighter letter spacing. The Windows Mobile core font Nina is a more condensed version of Tahoma and Verdana.

== Verdana Pro ==
Microsoft licensed rights to Verdana to Font Bureau for a new Verdana Pro release, published in 2011. Verdana Pro adds correct German closing quotation marks, light, semi-bold and black styles with italics, as well as condensed styles with italics across all weights. The expanded family was designed for organisations that had made extensive use of Verdana due to its availability but desired additional versions for greater flexibility. It is sold separately through print and web licenses, being sold by Font Bureau and Ascender, although Windows 10 users can acquire it free of charge from Microsoft Store or by activating the Pan-European Supplemental Fonts optional resource in the Settings app. A similar Georgia Pro release was announced at the same time.

== Combining characters bug ==
In the past, Verdana (v. 2.43) had an incorrect position for combining diacritical marks, causing them to display on the following character instead of the preceding. This made it unsuitable for Unicode-encoded text such as Cyrillic or Greek. This bug did not usually reveal itself with Latin letters. This is because some font display engines substitute sequences of base character + combining character with a precomposed character glyph. This bug was subsequently fixed in the version issued with Windows Vista. It is also fixed in Verdana version 5.01 font on Windows XP by installing the European Union Expansion Font Update from Microsoft.

== Awards ==
In 2006, the Verdana typeface was named in the list of British design icons in the Great British Design Quest organised by the BBC and the Design Museum. Carter's typeface appeared on a list which included Concorde, Mini, Jaguar E-Type, Aston Martin DB5, Supermarine Spitfire, World Wide Web, London tube map, AEC Routemaster bus and the K2 telephone box.

== Usage ==
In 2007, the font was used for the questions in Who Wants to Be a Millionaire?, replacing the ITC Conduit font.

In 2009, IKEA changed the typeface used in its catalog from Futura to Verdana, expressing a desire to unify its branding between print and web media. The controversy has been attributed to the perception of Verdana as a symbol of homogeneity in popular typography. Time magazine and the Associated Press ran articles on the controversy including a brief interview with an IKEA representative, focusing on the opinions of typographers and designers. Design and advertising industry-focused publications such as Business Week joined the fray of online posts. The branding critic blog Brand New was one of those using the Verdanagate name. The Australian online daily news site Crikey also published an article on the controversy. The Guardian ran an article asking "Ikea is changing its font to Verdana—causing outrage among typomaniacs. Should the rest of us care? Absolutely." The New York Times said the change to Verdana "is so offensive to many because it seems like a slap at the principles of design by a company that has been hailed for its adherence to them."

Carter addressed this controversy during an interview in 2013:

Ever since there was that big ruckus about the IKEA catalog changing from Futura to Verdana, which I had nothing to do with and didn’t even know about, people ask me about that everywhere I go. I give a talk about something historical and then at the end someone will get up and say: "I started a petition to go back to Futura. You’re a villain!" You get blamed for something you had nothing to do with.

There's a strange misunderstanding. A friendly guy came up to me at a conference recently and said: I signed that petition to go back to Futura. So I asked: what caused you to do that? And he said, well, Verdana is a screen font. You mustn’t use it in print. So I said: OK, well, so you open the IKEA catalog, it’s set in Verdana, with the big prices and everything… how do you tell it’s a screen font? What is it about Verdana that says: this is a screen font? He had no idea. He just knew it because he’d been told. There are many people who make judgments without really understanding what the typographic issues are. Students are interesting—they’ll say things to me like: my professor told me I cannot use Verdana and Georgia in print because they’re screen fonts, but I tried it and it looks perfectly all right. And I can only say: Thank you! Go ahead!

In 2019, with its logo refresh, IKEA again changed its corporate typeface from Verdana to a customized version of Noto Sans under the name Noto IKEA.

== See also ==
- Core fonts for the Web
- Georgia
- Segoe
- Tahoma
