= John MacKay Shaw =

Scottish-American business executive and writer

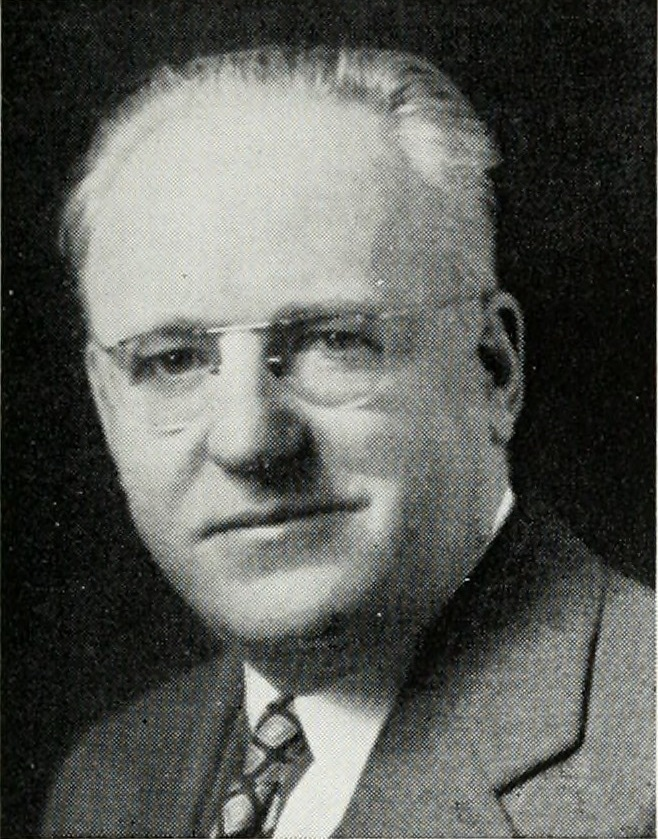
- Shaw in the 1950s
- Born: 15 May 1897; Glasgow, Scotland
- Died: 15 March 1984 (aged 86); Tallahassee, Florida, U.S.A.

John MacKay Shaw (15 May 1897 – 15 March 1984) was a Scottish-American business executive, bibliophile, philanthropist, and writer. He was interested in the tradition of poetry in the English language from the seventeenth through the twentieth centuries. He was especially attentive to its treatment of the theme of childhood.

== Early life ==
Shaw was born on 15 May 1897, in Glasgow, Scotland. His father immigrated to Philadelphia, Pennsylvania, to find work and the rest of the family followed him in 1911. He left school at the age of 14 and went first to work at John Wanamaker's department store as an errand boy and later to Wharton Business School where he took stenographic courses. During World War I, he joined the Ambulance Corps and served in France.

== Career ==
After the war, Shaw joined the steno pool at Mitten Management but he was chosen by the president of the company, Thomas Mitten, to serve as his private secretary. His specialty was in the field of public relations and advertising. When Mitten died, Shaw left the company to work as a public relations executive for the Bell Telephone System. In this role, he worked on the weekly radio program "The Bell Telephone Hour" and redesigned the New York City Yellow Pages.

While working for the company, he began to collect British and American poetry by and about children. He joined the Grolier Club and the American Library Association. When he retired in 1959, he donated almost 6,000 volumes to Florida State University. He created an 11-volume annotated bibliography, Childhood in Poetry. He was awarded an honorary doctor of humane letters in 1972.

== Later life ==
Shaw died on 15 March 1984, in Tallahassee, Florida.

== Bibliography ==
- Birchfield, James D. "The John MacKay Shaw Collection: Two Decades at Florida State." Florida State, Vol. 4, No. 3, Summer 1980, pp. 17– 19.
- Evory, Ann, ed., "John MacKay Shaw," Contemporary Authors. Detroit: Gale Research Company, 1978. Vol. 29-32, p. 629.
- Hendrickson, Norejane J. and Nancy Taylor Coghill. "Nineteenth-Century Children's Poetry: A Reflection of the Age." Children's Literature Association Quarterly, Vol. 11, Number 2, Summer 1986, pp. 72–77.
- Korn, Frederick. Poetry of the Great War: A Descriptive Catalogue of Resources in the Shaw Collection. Tallahassee: Florida State University Library, 1984.
- Patrick, Lucy. "The John MacKay Shaw Childhood in Poetry Collection," Florida Libraries, Vol. 49, No. 2, Fall 2006, pp. 13–15.
- Shaw, John MacKay. Childhood in Poetry; A Catalogue, With Biographical and Critical Annotations, of the Books of English and American Poets Comprising the Shaw Childhood in Poetry Collection. Detroit: Gale Research Company, 1967. 5 vols. Supplement of 3 vols. (1972); Supplement of 2 vols. (1976); Supplement (1980).
- Shaw, John MacKay. "Childhood in Poetry: The Forty-Year History of a Collection, 1929-1969," Antiquarian Bookman, 22–29 December 1969, rpt. as a monograph, Tallahassee: Florida State University, 1970.
- Shaw, John MacKay. "The Life of Thomas Eugene Mitten of Philadelphia (1874-1929)," unpublished manuscript in Free Library of Philadelphia.
- Shaw, John MacKay. The Parodies of Lewis Carroll and Their Originals. Tallahassee: Florida State University Library, 1960.
- Shaw, John MacKay. The Poems, Poets & Illustrators of St. Nicholas Magazine 1873-1943: An Index. Tallahassee: Florida State University Library, 1965.
- Shaw, John MacKay "Poetry for Children of Two Centuries" in Research About Nineteenth Century Children and Books. Monograph No. 17. University of Illinois, 1980.
- Shaw, John MacKay. Poetry of Sacred Song: A Short-Title List Supplementing Childhood in Poetry – A Catalogue. 1972.
- Shaw, John MacKay. The Things I Want. Darien, GA: The Ashantilly Press, 1967.
- Shaw, John MacKay. Zumpin; More Poems for Two Children. Tallahassee: Florida State University Library, 1969.
- Shaw, John MacKay and Frederick Korn. The Newspaper Poets: An Inventory of Holdings in the John M. Shaw Collection. Tallahassee: Florida State University Library, 1983.
- Shaw, John MacKay and Frederick Korn. Robert Burns: An Inventory of Burnsiana in the John M. Shaw Collection. Tallahassee: Florida State University Library, 1982.
- Tanzy, Conrad E. "The John MacKay Shaw Collection of 'Childhood in Poetry,'" The Journal of Library History, Vol. 1, No. 4, October 1966, pp. 220–233.
