= Berthold Wolpe =

German typographer and designer (1905–1989)

Berthold Wolpe OBE
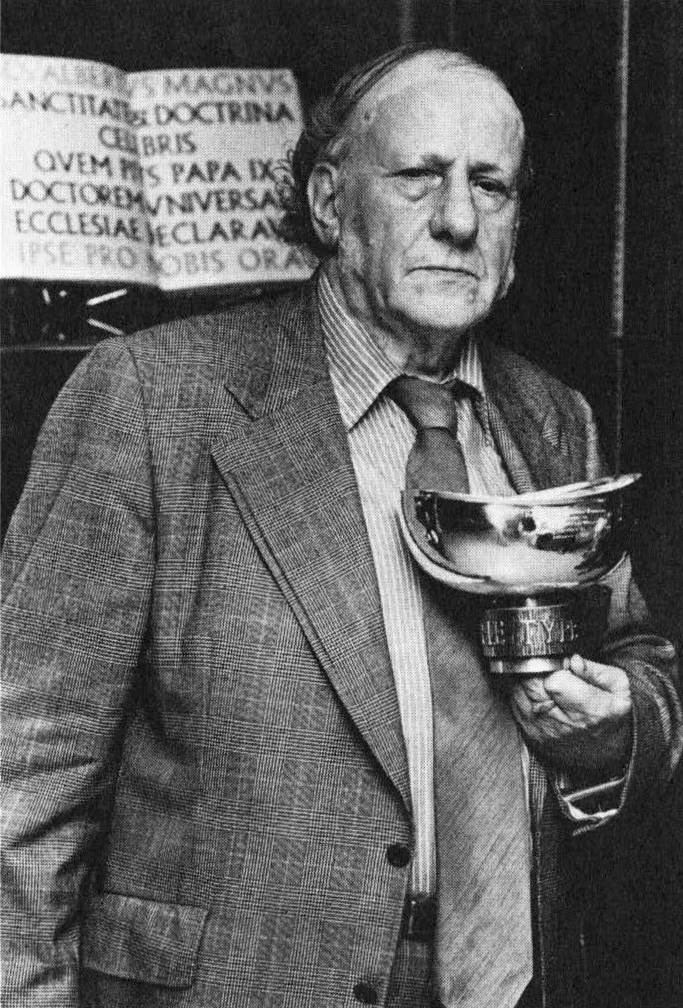
- Wolpe receiving the Goudy Award for achievement in printing in 1982
- Born: Berthold Ludwig Wolpe; 29 October 1905; Offenbach am Main, German Empire
- Died: 5 July 1989 (aged 83); London, England
- Citizenship: Germany; United Kingdom (from 1947)
- Occupations: Typographer, type designer
- Notable work: Albertus typeface
- Spouse: Margaret Leslie Smith (m. 1941)
- Children: 4

Berthold Ludwig Wolpe OBE (29 October 1905 – 5 July 1989) was a German calligrapher, typographer, type designer, book designer and illustrator. He was born into a Jewish family at Offenbach near Frankfurt, emigrated to England soon after the Nazis came to power in 1935 and became a naturalized British citizen in 1947. He was made a Royal Designer for Industry in 1959, awarded an honorary doctorate by the Royal College of Art in 1968 and appointed an Officer of the Order of the British Empire (OBE) in 1983. He died in London in 1989.

== Career ==
Wolpe began his career as an apprentice in a firm of metalworkers, followed by four years as a student of Rudolf Koch at the Offenbach Kunstgewerbeschule. In 1932 he visited London and met Stanley Morison, who invited Wolpe to design a printing type of capital letters for the Monotype Corporation. The typeface, Albertus, was first shown in 1935 and completed in 1940.

When World War II was declared Wolpe, along with other German nationals living in England, was sent to an internment camp in Australia. He was permitted to return to England in 1941 and joined the production department at Faber and Faber. His use of Albertus and hand-painted lettering became strongly identified with Faber jackets in the years that followed, and continued from 1958 on the Faber paper covered Editions. He remained at Faber until his retirement in 1975 and is estimated to have designed over 1,500 book covers and dust jackets.

In addition to Albertus, Wolpe designed several other typefaces. He also taught at the Frankfurt and Offenbach School of Art (1929–1933), Camberwell School of Art (1948–1953), Royal College of Art (1956–1957) and City & Guilds of London School of Art.

A retrospective exhibition of Wolpe's career was held at the V&A Museum in 1980 with Wolpe's involvement, and another in Mainz in 2006. In 2017 Wolpe's font design publisher Monotype released its Berthold Wolpe Collection, a set of updated digitisations of five Wolpe typefaces, and promoted them with an exhibition of Wolpe's work at the Type Museum in London.

== Typefaces ==
Wolpe's cover art for A Girl in Winter by Philip Larkin, published by Faber and Faber in 1965. His typeface Albertus is used on the right.

- Hyperion (1932), for the Bauer Foundry
- Albertus (c. 1932–1940), Wolpe's most popular typeface.
- Pegasus, a roman typeface with similarities to Albertus, in Walter Tracy's words: "a roman with something of the angularity of the gothic." Less popular than Albertus, privately revived by Matthew Carter for the 1980 exhibition on Wolpe's work, adding an italic and bold. A digitisation was released in 2013 by Dinamo, and another in 2017 by Toshi Omagari as part of Monotype's Wolpe Collection. Omagari's digitisation is used extensively by Tortoise Media.
- Tempest Titling (1935), an all-caps slanted display sans-serif for the Fanfare Press.
- Sachsenwald (1937–1938), a modernised blackletter. Never widely released due to the war, digitised 2017.
- Fanfare, a slanted condensed display sans-serif for the Fanfare Press.
- Decorata (1955)
- LPTB Italic (1973), an italic companion to London Underground's Johnston typeface

== Publications ==
- In 1959: A newe writing booke of copies, 1574, A facsimile of a unique Elisabethan Writing book in the Bodleian Library Oxford, Lion and Unicorn Press, London. In this book Wolpe added an introduction, notes and translations of the written texts in the original.

In 1960, Wolpe published Renaissance Handwriting: An Anthology of Italic Scripts, co-authored with Alfred Fairbank, World Publishing Company & Faber and Faber

In 1967, Wolpe prepared revived editions of the early nineteenth century specimen books of London typefounder Vincent Figgins.

In 1975, Wolpe published a monograph on the Elizabethan writing-master John de Beauchesne. The Life & Work of: John de Beauchesne & the First English Writing-books was published in a limited edition of 50 copies for the Society for Italic Handwriting, and was subsequently republished as a chapter in A. S. Osley's Scribes and Sources (1980).

== Personal life ==
His wife was fellow artist Margaret Wolpe (née Smith; sculptor and silversmith) and his children are Paul (doctor); Toby (technology journalist); Sarah [Wolpe-Lawrence] (designer and basket maker); Deborah [Hopson-Wolpe] (potter and printmaker – who uses BLW's Albertus typeface in her work).
