= Carter & Cone =

American digital type foundry

Carter & Cone's wordmark

Carter & Cone Type Inc. is an American digital type foundry that produces and markets the typefaces of British type designer Matthew Carter. The foundry was founded in 1992 by Carter and Cherie Cone and is based in Cambridge, Massachusetts. Cone, who lives in California, manages the business aspects of the foundry.

According to the Type Directors Club, "Carter & Cone have produced types on commission for Apple, Microsoft (the screen fonts Verdana and Georgia), Time, Newsweek, Wired, U.S. News & World Report, Sports Illustrated, The Washington Post, and the Walker Art Center."

In 1981, Carter and Cone were two of the four founders of Bitstream, a digital type foundry, also based in Cambridge, Massachusetts.
