= List of serif typefaces =

This list of samples of serif typefaces details standard serif fonts used in printing, classical typesetting and printing. Serif typefaces are generally regarded as easier to read than sans-serif fonts because they provide more detail.

== List of samples ==
Samples of serif typefaces
Typeface name	Example 1	Example 2	Example 3
Adobe Jenson Designer: Robert Slimbach Class: Old style			
Albertus Designer: Berthold Wolpe Class: Glyphic			
Aldus Designer: Hermann Zapf Class: Old style			
Alexandria Designer: Hank Gillette Class: Slab serif Sub-class: Geometric			
American Typewriter Designer: Joel Kaden & Tony Stan Class: Old style			
Amiri Designer: Khaled Hosny Class: Naskh			
Archer Designer: Tobias Frere-Jones & Jonathan Hoefler Class: Slab serif			
Arno Designer: Robert Slimbach Class: Old style			
Aster Designer: Francesco Simoncini Class: Modern			
Athelas Designer: Veronika Burian, Jose Scaglione			
Baskerville Designer: John Baskerville Class: Transitional			
Bauer Bodoni Designer: Heinrich Jost Class: Modern			
Bell Designer: Richard Austin Class: Modern			
Bembo Designer: Stanley Morison Class: Old style			
Benguiat Designer: Ed Benguiat Class: Decorative			
Bernhard Modern Designer: Lucian Bernhard Class: Old style			
Bodoni Designer: Giambattista Bodoni Class: Modern			
Bookman Designer: Alexander Phemister Class: Old style			
Bookerly Class: Other			
Bulmer Designer: William Martin Class: Transitional			
Caledonia Designer: William Addison Dwiggins Class: Transitional			
Calisto Designer: Ron Carpenter Class: Old style			
Cambria Designer: Jelle Bosma Class: Transitional			
Caslon Designer: William Caslon Class: Old style			
Centaur Designer: Bruce Rogers Class: Old style			
Century Schoolbook Designer: Morris Fuller Benton Class: Modern			
Chaparral Designer: Carol Twombly Class: Slab serif Sub-class: Humanist			
Bitstream Charter Designer: Matthew Carter Class: Transitional, Slab serif			
Cheltenham Designer: Bertram Goodhue & Ingalls Kimball Class: Old style			
City Designer: Georg Trump Class: Slab serif	—N/a	—N/a	
Clarendon Designer: Robert Besley Class: Slab serif			
Cochin Designer: Georges Peignot, Matthew Carter Class: Transitional			
Computer Modern Designer: Donald Knuth Class: Modern			
Constantia Designer: John Hudson Class: Other			
Constructium Designer: Rebecca Bettencourt Class: Other			
Copperplate Gothic Designer: Frederic Goudy Class: Wedge serif			
Della Robbia Designer: Thomas Maitland Cleland Class: Old Style, Wedge Serif			
Didot Class: Modern			
Droid Serif Designer: Steve Matteson Class: Other			
Emerson Designer: Joseph Blumenthal Class: Old style			
FF Scala Designer: Martin Majoor Class: Old style			
Footlight Designer: Ong Chong Wah	—N/a	—N/a	
Friz Quadrata Designer: Ernst Friz & Victor Caruso Class: Decorative			
ITC Galliard Designer: Matthew Carter Class: Old style			
Garamond Designer: Claude Garamond & Jean Jannon Class: Old style			
Gentium Designer: Victor Gaultney Class: Other			
Georgia Designer: Matthew Carter Class: Transitional			
Goudy Old Style Designer: Frederic Goudy Class: Old style			
Granjon Designer: George William Jones Class: Old style			
Hoefler Text Designer: Jonathan Hoefler Class: Old style			
Iowan Old Style Designer: John Downer Class: Old style		—N/a	
Janson Designer: Chauncey H. Griffith Class: Old style			
Joanna Designer: Eric Gill Class: Transitional			
Junicode Designer: Peter S. Baker Class: Old style			
Korinna Designer: Ed Benguiat & Vic Caruso Class: Decorative		—N/a	
Liberation Serif Designer: Steve Matteson Class: Other			—N/a
Linux Libertine Designer: Philipp H. Poll Class: Transitional			
Literata Designer: Google & TypeTogether Class: Scotch, Old style			
Literaturnaya Designer: Anatolii Shchukin Class: Transitional			
Matrix (typeface) Designer: Zuzana Licko			
Memphis Designer: Rudolf Wolf Class: Slab serif			
Minion Designer: Robert Slimbach Class: Old style			
Mrs Eaves Designer: Zuzana Licko Class: Transitional	—N/a		
MS Serif Designer: Microsoft		—N/a	
New York Designer: Susan Kare, Charles Bigelow, and Kris Holmes Class: Transitional	—N/a	—N/a	
Nilland Designer: Manfred Klein Class: Slab serif	—N/a	—N/a	
Palatino Designer: Hermann Zapf Class: Old style			
Perpetua Designer: Eric Gill Class: Transitional			
Plantin Designer: Christophe Plantin Class: Old style		—N/a	
IBM Plex Serif Designer: Mike Abbink Class: Transitional, Scotch		—N/a	
Rawlinson Roadway Designer: James Montalbano Class: Old style	—N/a		—N/a
Requiem Designer: Jonathan Hoefler Class: Old style	—N/a	—N/a	
Roboto Slab Designer: Christian Robertson Class: Slab serif	—N/a	—N/a	
Rockwell Class: Slab serif			
Rotis Designer: Otl Aicher Class: Other	—N/a		
Sabon Designer: Jan Tschichold Class: Old style			
Serifa Designer: Adrian Frutiger Class: Slab serif	—N/a	—N/a	
Source Serif Pro Designer: Frank Grießhammer Class: Transitional			
Stempel Schneidler Designer: F.H. Ernst Schneidler Class: Old style			
Theano Didot Designer: Alexey Kryukov Class: Modern	—N/a	—N/a	
Times New Roman Designer: Stanley Morison Class: Transitional			
Trajan Designer: Carol Twombly Class: Old Style			
Trinité Designer: Bram de Does Class: Humanist serif		—N/a	
Trump Mediaeval Designer: Georg Trump Class: Old Style	—N/a	—N/a	
Utopia Designer: Robert Slimbach Class: Didone	—N/a	—N/a	
Walbaum Designer: Justus Erich Walbaum Class: Didone			
Windsor Designer: Eleisha Pechey Class: Old style			
Zilla Slab Class: Slab serif			

== Additional serif typefaces ==
- Algerian
- Allegro
- Apple Garamond
- Arrighi
- Artcraft
- Athens
- Auriol
- Aurora
- Belwe Roman
- Berkeley Old Style
- Berling
- Beton
- Book Antiqua (Monotype's imitation of Palatino)
- Candida
- Cartier
- Caslon Antique
- Catull
- Century Old Style
- Charis SIL
- Cholla Slab
- Clearface
- Cloister
- Concrete Roman
- Corona
- Courier
- Courier Prime
- Dante
- Deepdene
- Doves Type
- Ehrhardt
- Egyptienne
- Electra
- Elephant
- Ellington
- Excelsior
- Fairfield
- Filosofia
- Fournier MT
- Freight
- Golden Type
- Guardian Egyptian
- Hess Old Style
- Hightower Text
- Imprint
- Ionic No. 5
- Jomolhari
- Karnak
- Kennerley Old Style
- Koch-Antiqua
- Lexia
- Lexicon
- Libertinus
- Méridien
- Miller
- Monticello
- Neutraface Slab
- Nimbus Mono L
- Nimbus Roman No. 9 L
- Noto Serif
- Old Style (Miller & Richard)
- Opticon
- Paragon
- Produkt
- PT Serif
- Record type
- Renault
- Romain du Roi
- Rusher's Patent Types
- Scotch Roman
- Skeleton Antique
- Solus
- Source Han Serif
- STIX Two Text
- Surveyor
- Sylfaen
- Taigi Unicode
- Textype
- TheSerif
- Tinos
- Tower
- Triplex
- Veronese
- Vincent Text
- Warnock
- XITS
- Yale (typeface)

== See also ==
- Fixedsys
- List of display typefaces
- List of monospaced typefaces
- List of sans serif typefaces
- List of script typefaces
