= Standard Deviations (exhibition) =

2011 exhibition at the Museum of Modern Art

Standard Deviations was the name of a Museum of Modern Art exhibition that was notable for showcasing the 23 digital typefaces that MoMA acquired in January 2011 for its Architecture and Design Collection. The exhibition was open from March 2, 2011 through January 30, 2012. The full title of the exhibition was Standard Deviations: Types and Families in Contemporary Design, though the title was originally announced as Standard Deviations: Prototypes, Archetypes, and Families in Contemporary Design. The exhibition was organized by Paola Antonelli, Senior Curator in the Department of Architecture and Kate Carmody, curatorial assistant.

While the exhibition showed works of design other than typefaces, the selection and acquisition of typefaces was significant in the history of typographic design. Aside from a set of 36-point Helvetica Bold lead type designed by Max Miedinger in 1956, these were the first typefaces acquired by MoMA.

== Twenty-three typefaces ==
| Typeface | Year | Designer | Foundry | Source |
|---|---|---|---|---|
| Bell Centennial | 1976–1978 | Matthew Carter | Mergenthaler Linotype Company | |
| Big Caslon | 1994 | Matthew Carter | Carter & Cone | |
| Dead History | 1990 | P. Scott Makela, Zuzana Licko | Emigre | |
| FF Beowolf | 1990 | Erik van Blokland, Just van Rossum | FontShop | |
| FF Blur | 1992 | Neville Brody | FontShop | |
| FF DIN | 1995 | Albert-Jan Pool | FontShop | |
| FF Meta | 1984–1991 | Erik Spiekermann | FontShop | |
| Gotham | 2000 | Jonathan Hoefler, Tobias Frere-Jones | Hoefler Type Foundry | |
| HTF Didot | 1991 | Jonathan Hoefler | Hoefler Type Foundry | |
| Interstate | 1993–1995 | Tobias Frere-Jones | Font Bureau | |
| ITC Galliard | 1978 | Matthew Carter | International Typeface Corporation | |
| Keedy Sans | 1991 | Jeffery Keedy | Emigre | |
| Mantinia | 1993 | Matthew Carter | Carter & Cone | |
| Mason | 1992 | Jonathan Barnbrook | Emigre | |
| Mercury | 1996 | Jonathan Hoefler, Tobias Frere-Jones | Hoefler & Frere-Jones | |
| Miller | 1997 | Matthew Carter | Font Bureau | |
| New Alphabet | 1967 | Wim Crouwel | — | |
| Oakland | 1985 | Zuzana Licko | Emigre | |
| OCR-A | 1966 | American Type Founders | American Type Founders | |
| Retina | 1999 | Jonathan Hoefler, Tobias Frere-Jones | Hoefler Type Foundry | |
| Template Gothic | 1990 | Barry Deck | Emigre | |
| Verdana | 1995 | Matthew Carter | Microsoft | |
| Walker | 1995 | Matthew Carter | Walker Art Center | |

The selection of typefaces met with some criticism. On Design Observer, Paul Shaw expressed "puzzlement" over the selection and questioned the omission of important foundries and typefaces in the digital era. While the timeframe of the selections represents a time of diversification in type design, all but two are associated with either Matthew Carter, Jonathan Hoefler, Tobias Frere-Jones, Emigre or FontShop.
