= Zuzana Licko =

American type designer (born 1961)

- Born: Zuzana Ličko; 1961 (age 64–65); Bratislava, Czechoslovakia
- Education: University of California, Berkeley
- Known for: Typeface designer, graphic designer
- Notable work: Fonts, including Mrs Eaves; Emigre magazine
- Movement: Postmodernism
- Awards: AIGA Medal

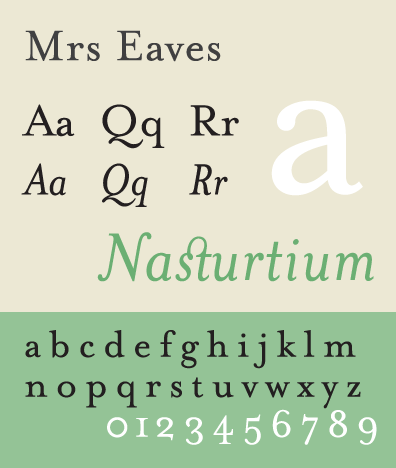
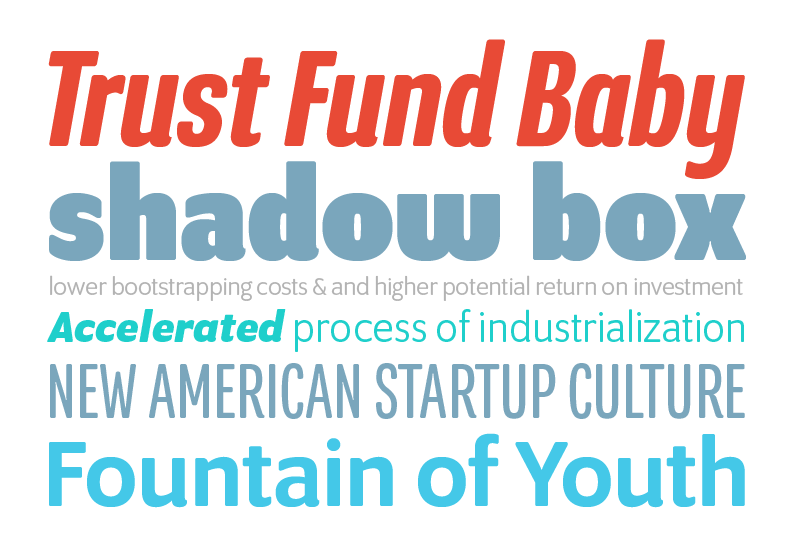
Fonts designed by Licko (Mrs. Eaves, Oakland, and Program)

Zuzana Licko (born Zuzana Ličko, 1961) is a Slovak-born American type designer and visual artist known for co-founding Emigre Fonts, a digital type foundry in Berkeley, CA. She has designed and produced numerous digital typefaces including the popular Mrs Eaves, Modula, Filosofia, and Matrix. In 1997, Licko was awarded the AIGA Medal for her contributions to American graphic design.

As a corresponding interest she also creates ceramic sculptures and jacquard weavings.

== Early life ==
Licko was born in Bratislava, Czechoslovakia and came to the United States with her family aged 7. She studied architecture, photography, and computer programming before earning a degree in graphic communications at the University of California at Berkeley.

Licko was introduced to computers by her father, a biomathematician at the University of California, San Francisco. She would help him with data processing during her summer breaks. The first font she created on a computer was a Greek alphabet, adapted for the pen plotter, which her father used on his graph printouts.

When she started her university education, her goal was to earn a degree in architecture, but she changed to a visual studies major when she discovered her passion after taking graphic design and typography classes. While at Berkeley, Licko took a calligraphy class, but struggled with it, because she was forced to write with her right hand even though she is left-handed. This experience influenced her rejection of many traditional type design practices as she started exploring the capabilities of the Macintosh computer.

In an interview featured in Eye, Licko described her creative relationship with her husband Rudy Vanderlans:

We met at the University of California at Berkeley where I was an undergraduate at the College of Environmental Design and Rudy was a graduate student in photography. This was in 1982–83. After college we both did all sorts of design-related odd jobs. There was no direction. Then, in 1984 the Macintosh was introduced, we bought one, and everything started to fall into place. We both, each in our own way, really enjoyed this machine. It forced us to question everything we had learnt about design. We both enjoyed that process of exploration, of how far you could push the limits. Rudy is more intuitive; I’m more methodical. Yin and yang. It seemed to click, and still does.

== Emigre ==
In 1985, Licko and VanderLans started Emigre Graphics which had grown out of Emigre magazine, a publication co-founded by VanderLans and two Dutch friends the previous year. VanderLans also started incorporating the bitmap typefaces that Licko designed on the Apple Macintosh in his layouts with issue # 2. Licko's experimental type designs became a prominent feature of the magazine for its entire run. Licko began selling commercial licenses of its digital fonts to users worldwide, first under the name Emigre Graphics and later as Emigre Fonts.

Emigre magazine prominently featured Licko's fonts, some of which were initially created for use in the publication. The magazine is an unintentional archive of Licko's work and progression as a type designer. From her pixelated fonts optimized for bitmap printing to her sophisticated vector designs, Licko's technique advanced with technology. In Emigre: Graphic Design into the Digital Realm, Licko discusses her necessary departure from classic type forms in her early fonts.

I started my venture with bitmap type designs, created for the coarse resolutions of the computer screen and dot matrix printer. The challenge was that because the early computers were so limited in what they could do you really had to design something special. Even if it was difficult to adapt calligraphy to lead and later lead to photo technology, it could be done, but it was physically impossible to adapt 8-point Goudy Old Style to 72 dots to the inch. In the end you couldn't tell Goudy Old Style from Times Roman or any other serif text face.

Licko has designed at least three dozen font families. In the mid-1990s, she worked on two notable revivals: Mrs Eaves (based on Baskerville) and Filosofia (based on Bodoni). Updating these historical models for use both in print and on-screen, Licko included extensive ligatures with each typeface. Emigre is not just for fonts. In recent years, Licko has turned her attention to creating ceramics and textiles under the same moniker. In a 2017 interview with Zuzana Kvetkova, Licko shares about her love of ceramics and her process:

I’ve always enjoyed creating ceramic objects, and I need this to balance out the ephemeral nature of digital work. I find that my current work on modular ceramic sculptures and fabric prints is actually an extension of type design. I’m using font software to create sketches for my ceramic sculptures, which exist of repeating elements. Each sculpture has a variety of shapes that can be combined to make different sculptures. The font software helps me go through the possible variations. The elements for the textile designs are also created as fonts, which I configure into various patterns. Perhaps my focusing on a physical medium is a reaction against everything being consumed digitally these days.

== Fonts designed by Licko ==
- Bitmaps: Emperor, Universal, Oakland and Emigre, 1985, re-released as Lo-Res, 2001
- Modula, 1985
- Citizen, 1986
- Matrix (typeface), 1986, re-released as Matrix II, 2007
- Variex, 1988 (collaboration with Rudy VanderLans)
- Oblong, 1988 (collaboration with Rudy VanderLans)
- Senator, 1988
- Lunatix, 1988
- Elektrix, 1989
- Triplex (typeface), 1989, Condensed added in 1991
- Totally Gothic, 1990
- Journal, 1990
- Whirligig, 1994
- Dogma, 1994
- Modula Round, Outlined & Ribbed, 1995
- Soda Script, 1995
- Base Nine and Twelve, 1995
- Mrs Eaves, 1996, based on the 18th century designs of John Baskerville
- Filosofia and Filosofia Grand, 1996
- Base Monospace, 1997
- Hypnopaedia, 1997
- Tarzana, 1998
- Solex, 2000
- Fairplex, 2002
- Puzzler, 2005
- Mrs Eaves XL Serif, 2009
- Mr Eaves Sans, 2009
- Mr Eaves XL Sans, 2009
- Base 900, 2010
- Program, 2013
- Tangly, 2018
- Crackly, 2019
- Monospaced, 2023
- Outlined, 2023

== Essays by Licko ==
- Ambition/Fear, Emigre 11, with Rudy VanderLans, 1989.
- Discovery by Design, Emigre 32, edited by Rudy VanderLans, 1994.
- Ceramics and Type Design: Differently Similar, online at the Emigre website.
- Emigre: Graphic Design into the Digital Realm. ISBN 9780471285472

== Awards ==
Licko and her husband Rudy VanderLans won the Chrysler Design Award in 1994. Apart from winning this award, their work on Emigre also won the Publish magazine Impact Award in 1996. A year later, they got an American Institute for Graphic Arts Gold Medal Award. Soon after, in 1998 they were awarded the Charles Nyples Award in Innovation in Typography.

The Society of Typographic Aficionados awarded Licko the 2013 SOTA Typography Award, citing her "intellectual, highly-structured approach to type design" and her contributions to the digital typography industry.

- MacUser Desktop Publisher of the Year Award, 1986
- Chrysler Award for Innovation in Design, 1994
- Publish Magazine Impact Awards, 1996
- American Institute of Graphic Arts Gold Medal, 1997
- Charles Nypels Award for Excellence in Typography, 1998
- Honorary members of the Society of Typographic Arts, Chicago, 2010
- Society of Typographic Aficionados Annual Typography Award, 2013
- 29th New York Type Directors Club Medal, 2016

== Museum exhibits ==
Solo exhibitions

- "Emigre Magazine: Selections from the Permanent Collection", Museum of Modern Art, San Francisco, 1997
- "Charles Nypels Prize", Jan van Eyck Academy, Maastricht, Netherlands, 1998
- "Emigre in Istanbul", Contemporary Art Center, Istanbul, Turkey, 1999
- "Emigre in Norfolk", Old Dominion University Gallery, Norfolk, Virginia, 2005
- "Emigre at Gallery 16", Gallery 16, San Francisco, 2010
- "Emigre magazine: design, discourse and authorship", University of Reading, UK, 2017

General exhibitions

- "Pacific Wave: California Graphic Design", Museo Fortuny, Venice, Italy, 1987
- "Graphic Design in America", Walker Art Center, Minneapolis, 1989
- "Mixing Messages: Graphic Design in Contemporary Culture", Cooper-Hewitt National Design Museum, 1996
- "Designer as Author, Voices and Visions", Northern Kentucky University, 1996
- "Design Culture Now: National Design Triennial", Cooper-Hewitt National Design Museum, 2000
- "East Coast/West Coast" at Centre du Graphisme, Echirolles, France, 2002
- "D-Day:le design aujourd'hui," at Centre Pompidou, Paris, 2005
- "Digitally Mastered", MoMA, New York, 2007
- "Quick, Quick, Slow", Experimentadesign Lisboa 2009, Berardo Collection Museum, Lisbon, Portugal, 2009 (featured Emigre magazine issues10–24)
- "Typographic Tables", Museum of Modern and Contemporary Art, Bolzano, Italy, 2011
- "Deep Surface: Contemporary Ornament and Pattern", Contemporary Art Museum, Raleigh, 2011
- "Graphic Design: Now in Production", Walker Art Center, Minneapolis, 2011 (featured "Emigre No. 70: The Look Back Issue" and Base 900)
- "Postmodernism: Style and Subversion 1970–1990", Victoria & Albert Museum, London, 2011
- "Standard Deviations," MoMA, New York, 2011 (featured 23 digital typefaces for their permanent collection, including five Emigre font families: Jeffery Keedy's Keedy Sans, Jonathan Barnbrook's Mason Serif, Barry Deck's Template Gothic, Zuzana Licko's Oakland—renamed Lo-Res in 2001—and P. Scott Makela's Dead History)
- "Work from California", 25th International Biennial of Graphic Design, Brno, Czech Republic, 2012
- "Revolution/Evolution", College for Creative Studies, Detroit, 2014
- "Typeface to Interface", Museum of Modern Art, San Francisco, 2016
- "California Graphic Design, 1975–95", Los Angeles County Museum of Art, Los Angeles, 2018
- "Between the Lines: Typography in LACMA’s Collection", Los Angeles County Museum of Art, Los Angeles, 2019

Permanent collections

- Denver Art Museum holds a complete set of Emigre magazine in their permanent collection.
- Design Museum in London holds a complete set of Emigre magazine in their permanent collection.
- Letterform Archive holds the Emigre Archives in their permanent collection.
- Museum für Gestaltung (Museum of Design, Zurich) holds Emigre magazine issues in their permanent collection.
- Museum of Modern Art in New York holds a complete set of Emigre magazine, and five digital fonts from the Emigre Fonts library in their permanent collection.
- Museum of Modern Art in San Francisco holds a complete set of Emigre magazine in their permanent collection.

== See also ==
- List of AIGA medalists
- Filosofia
- Mrs Eaves
- Pirouette: Turning Points in Design

== Additional online resources ==
- Eye (Website), “Cult of the Ugly,” by Steven Heller, 1993
- Letter to Emigre Magazine, (PDF) by Gunnar Swanson, 1994
- 2x4 (Website), “Designer as Author,” by Michael Rock, 1996
- Graphic Design USA 18. "Critical Conditions: Zuzana Licko, Rudy VanderLans, and the Emigre Spirit" by Michael Dooley, 1998.
- SpeakUp (Website), Interview with Rudy VanderLans by Armin Vit, 2002.
- Typotheque (Website), “Context in Critique,” review of Emigre #64, Rant, by Dmitri Siegel, 2004
- Typotheque (Website), “Rudy VanderLans, editor of Emigre,” interview by David Casacuberta and Rosa Llop, 2004
- AIGA (Website), “An Interview with Rudy VanderLans: Still Subversive After All These Years,” by Steven Heller, 2004
- Design Observer (Website), "Emigre: An Ending", by Rick Poynor, 2005
- TapeOp (Website), “Rudy VanderLans: Emigre No. 69: The End,” review by John Baccigaluppi, 2008
- Eye (Website), “The farewell tour syndrome,” book review by Emily King, 2009
- Communication Arts (Website), “Emigre No.70: The Look Back Issue,” book review by Angelynn Grant, 2009
- Dwell (Website), "Emigre No.70,” book review by Miyoko Ohtake, 2009
- Print (Website), “Emigre’s Lucky Number,” by Steven Heller, 2009
- Print magazine (Website), “Design Couples: Rudy VanderLans and Zuzana Licko," interview by Caitlin Dover, 2010
- Étapes magazine (Website) Zuzana Licko interview with Pascal Béjean, 2010
- Fast Company (Website), “Type Master: An Interview with Emigre’s Rudy VanderLans," by Alissa Walker, 2010.
- MoMA (Website), Emigre Magazine, issues 1-69, permanent collection, 2011
- MoMA (Website), Oakland typeface, permanent collection, 2011
- The Atlantic (Website), "Can the Rule-Breaking Font Designers of Three Decades Ago Still Break Rules?,” by Steven Heller, 2012
- Plazm Magazine (Website), "In Conversation with Emigre" by Sara Dougher and Joshua Berger, 2013
- 100 Best Fonts, 2015
- Print (Website), “The Legibility Wars of the ‘80s and ‘90s,” 2016
- Communication Arts (Website), “Emigre Fonts,” book review by Angelynn Grant, 2016
- AIGA, Eye on Design (Website), “Emigre Type Foundry Pretty Much Designed the ‘90s—Here’s What it Looked Like,” book review by Angela Riechers, 2016
- MyFonts (Website), interview with Zuzana Licko by Jan Middendorp, 2016.
- Fontstand (Website), “Emigre: Time and Time Again,” by Sébastien Morlighem, 2016
- Klim Type Foundry (Website), “Tilting at windmills,” Rudy vanderLans replies to "Welcome to the infill font foundry", 2016
- Huffington Post (Website), “One of Today’s Most Popular Fonts Has a Wild Centuries-Long History,” by Maddie Crum, 2017
- University of Reading (Website), “Emigre magazine: design, discourse and authorship,” an exhibition curated by Francisca Monteiro and Rick Poynor, 2017
- Typography & Graphic Communication (Website), "Emigre magazine: design, discourse and authorship,” exhibition, 2017
- ReadyMag Stories (Website), “Emigre,” by Zhdan Philippov and Vitaly Volk, 2020
- “Typography and Legibility: An Analysis of Tschichold, Licko, and VanderLans,” (PDF) by Chaney Boyle, 2020

== Additional print resources ==
Additional print resources

- Bouvet, Michel, East Coast West Coast: Graphistes aux États-unis, Paris, France, Les Éditions Textuel, 2002. Essay on history of Emigre.
- Cees W. De Jong, Alston W. Purvis, and Friedrich Friedl. 2005. Creative Type: A Sourcebook of Classical and Contemporary Letterforms. Thames & Hudson.
- Dawson, Peter, The Field Guide to Typography: Typefaces in the Urban Landscape, New York, NY, Prestel, 2013. Interview with Rudy VanderLans & Zuzana Licko.
- Eskilson, Stephen J., Graphic Design: A New History, London, UK, Laurence King Publishing, 2007. Essay on Emigre in chapter on "Postmodern Typography".
- Gerda Breuer and Julia Meer, ed. (2012). Women in Graphic Design. Berlin: Jovis. pp. 197, 501, 502. ISBN 9783868591538.
- Heller, Stephen, ed., Design Literacy: Understanding Graphic Design. New York, NY, Allworth Press with School of Visual Arts, 2014. Essay on Emigre in chapter on "Mass Media".
- Lupton, Ellen, Mixing Messages: Graphic Design in Contemporary Culture, New York, NY, Princeton Architectural Press, 1996. Short profile of Emigre and Zuzana Licko's typefaces. Book published in conjunction with exhibit at Cooper-Hewitt National Design Museum.
- McCarthy, Steven, The Designer as Author, Producer, Activist, Entrepreneur, Curator & Collaborator: New Models for Communicating, Amsterdam, Netherlands, BIS, 2013. Emigre referenced throughout, and short profile of Emigre in chapter on "Typographic Design Authorship".
- Meggs, Philip B., ed., A History of Graphic Design, New York, NY, John Wiley & Sons, 1998. Profile of Emigre in chapter on "Pioneers of Digital Graphic Design".
- Poynor, Rick, Design Without Boundaries: Visual Communication in Transition, London, UK, Booth-Clibborn Editions, 1998. Emigre referenced in essay "Cult of the Ugly", and one essay, "Into the Digital Realm", on Emigre.
- Poynor, Rick, No More Rules: Graphic Design and Postmodernism, New Haven, CT, Yale University Press, 2003. Emigre referenced throughout.
- Shaughnessy, Adrian, How to be a Graphic Designer, Without Losing Your Soul, London, UK, Laurence King Publishing, 2005. Interview with Rudy VanderLans.
