= Emigre (magazine) =

American graphic design magazine (1984–2005)

- Issue 69
- Editor: Rudy VanderLans
- Categories: Graphic Design, Typography, Type Design
- Frequency: usually on a quarterly basis
- Paid circulation: 2,500 – 3000
- Unpaid circulation: 35,000 – 40,000
- Total circulation: 69 issues
- First issue: 1984
- Final issue: 2005
- Company: Emigre Graphics
- Country: United States
- Based in: Berkeley, California
- Language: English
- Website: www.emigre.com/EMagView.php
- ISSN: 1045-3717

Emigre was a quarterly magazine published from 1984 until 2005 in Berkeley, California, dedicated to visual communication, graphic design, typography, and design criticism.

Produced, edited, and designed by Rudy VanderLans and typeset by Zuzana Licko using a Macintosh computer, Emigre pioneered desktop publishing and set the standard for the first digitally designed layouts and typeface designs. At the time, its use of experimentation and disregard for conventions followed by then-prevalent modernist designers made Emigre both a controversial and a highly influential voice in graphic design.

Exposure to Licko's typefaces through the magazine lead to the creation of Emigre Fonts in 1985.

== History ==
=== 1984–1988 ===
Emigre was a graphic design magazine founded by fellow Dutchmen Marc Susan, Menno Meyjes, and Rudy VanderLans who met in San Francisco. The first four issues were edited by Susan and art directed by VanderLans, with Meyes mostly in an associate publisher role. By issue 6 (1986) Susan and Meyes had left, and all subsequent issues were edited and art directed by VanderLans. In 1985, VanderLans started incorporating the bitmap typefaces designed by Zuzana Licko in his layouts. Licko’s type designs became a prominent feature of the magazine for its entire run. By 1986, Emigre began selling commercial licenses of its digital fonts under the name Emigre Fonts.

The magazine was always self-funded, initially through commercial design work performed by VanderLans and Licko under the name Emigre Graphics which became Emigre Fonts. Additional income came from sporadic advertisement sales and subscriptions. Later issues were funded primarily by licensing of digital typefaces.

When the magazine began in 1984, it featured work by and topics important to émigré artists. The first eight issues were concerned with boundaries, international culture, travel accounts, and alienation (as the issues' titles suggest). These eight issues also incorporated a dynamic aesthetic that caught the attention of other designers.

=== 1989–1994 ===
As the publication grew in popularity (and sometimes notoriety) it gained collaborators. VanderLans invited guests such as Gail Swanlund, Anne Burdick, Andrew Blauvelt, and Experimental Jetset to edit dedicated issues, and readers began to recognize Jeffery Keedy, Kenneth FitzGerald, Lorraine Wild, and Diane Gromala as recurring contributors.

A notable content shift started with issue 9, which featured the art of Vaughan Oliver at 4AD. About this time, Emigre's articles began to explore contemporary design practice more intentionally, catalyzing the magazine as a kind of analog discussion forum. Later issues would be devoted to Cranbrook, the Macintosh, type design, and occasionally individual graphic designers. Increasingly, Emigre's content centered around design writing and critical essays.

=== 1995–2005 ===
Design discourse became primary to Emigre's publications by 1994, and the magazine transitioned in 1995 from its oversized layout to a text-friendlier format that debuted with issue 33. The magazine remained this size until issue 60, released in 2001. Issues 60–63 were accompanied by additional media: three compact discs (featuring the music of Honey Barbara, The Grassy Knoll and Scenic) and one DVD (Catfish, an experimental documentary film on the work of designer and performance artist Elliott Earls). In its fourth and final incarnation, the last six issues of Emigre (64–69) were co-published by Princeton Architectural Press as small softcover books. The last issue, The End, was published in 2005.

== Reputation and legacy ==
Emigre was one of the first publications to be designed on Macintosh computers, and their work heavily influenced other graphic designers in the early digital era. Its variety of layouts, use of guest designers, and opinionated articles broke away from traditional design practices, making Emigre leaders in Postmodern design and landing them squarely in the middle of controversy. They were equally lauded and criticized for this work. Licko's response that "You read best what you read most," to an interview question about the legibility of her experimental bitmap fonts published in issue 15 (1990) incited what would later be known as the "Legibility Wars." Her statement indicated that fonts such as Helvetica and Times New Roman are not intrinsically legible but become so through repeated use, and it was not entirely well received.

In 1991, the prominent New York designer Massimo Vignelli criticized Emigre's work, calling it "garbage" and "an aberration of culture" in an interview published by Print magazine. This brought much attention to their work and sealed Emigre's reputation as design radicals.

Six years later Licko and VanderLans were named AIGA medalists and the San Francisco Museum of Modern Art staged a solo exhibition of Emigre's work. In 2007, the Museum of Modern Art (New York) exhibited all 69 issues of Emigre as part of the exhibition "Digitally Mastered."

== Formats ==
The magazine changed formats several times. It was originally published quarterly in a large format where each page measures 285 mm × 425 mm (slightly shorter than 11 × 17" or US ledger/tabloid size). Starting with issue 33, each page was about 8.5 × 11" (US letter size). It changed into a multimedia format (a booklet where each page was 133 × 210 mm, plus a CD or DVD) starting with issue 60. And finally, starting with issue 64, the magazine became a book format, published semi-annually, where each page measured 133 × 210 mm. The issues in the book format were co-published by Princeton Architectural Press.

- Issues 1–32: US tabloid size, approximately 11 x 17 in (285 x 425 mm) — 32–40 pages
- Issues 33–59: US letter size, 8.5 x 11 in (216 x 279 mm) — 64–80 pages
- Issues 60–63: 5.25 x 8.25 in (133 x 210 mm) — 64-page booklet + CD or DVD in cardboard wallet
- Issues 64–69: 5.25 x 8.25 in (133 x 210 mm) — 144 pages

== Books ==
- Emigre: Graphic Design into the Digital Realm, New York, NY: Van Nostrand Reinhold; John Wiley & Sons, 1993
- Emigre: Rosbeek 43, Charles Nypels Award, 1998, Netherlands: Drukkerij Rosbeek, 1998
- Emigre No.70, Selections from Emigre Magazine #1–#69, Berkeley, CA: Gingko Press, 2009
- Departures: Five Milestone Font Families by Emigre, Berkeley, CA: Emigre, 2011
- Emigre Fonts: Type Specimens 1986–2016, Berkeley, CA: Gingko Press, 2016

== Emigre Music ==
Inspired by the flourishing DIY culture in music, and the success and growing reach of Emigre's publishing and mail order business, Emigre Music was launched in 1990. A total of 22 albums and compilations were released in CD and cassette formats. The final three CDs were included in issues of Emigre magazine.

Emigre Music Albums

- Stephen Sheehan, Innocence At Will (1990)
- Fact TwentyTwo, Energy, Work & Power (1990)
- Every Good Boy, Social Graces (1990)
- Binary Race, Fits And Starts (1991)
- Basehead, Play With Toys (1991)
- Supercollider, Supercollider (1991)
- Fact TwentyTwo, The Biographic Humm (1991)
- Ray Carmen, Nothing Personal (1991)
- Every Good Boy, Baling Wire And Bubble Gum (1992)
- Audioafterbirth, Commbine (1992)
- Emigre Music Sampler No. 1 (1992)
- Honey Barbara, Feedlotloophole (1993)
- Supercollider, Dual (1993)
- The Emigre Music Sampler No. 2 (1993)
- Dreaming Out Loud: Emigre Music Sampler No. 3 (1994)
- Itchy Pet, Dreaming Out Louder (1998)
- Palm Desert (1999)
- Cucamonga (2000)
- Hard Sleeper, Dreaming Out Loudest (2000)
- Honey Barbara, I-10 & W.AVE. (2001)
- The Grassy Knoll, Happily Ever After (2002)
- Scenic, The Acid Gospel Experience (2002)

== Awards ==
- MacUser Desktop Publisher of the Year Award, 1986
- Chrysler Award for Innovation in Design, 1994
- Publish Magazine Impact Awards, 1996
- American Institute of Graphic Arts Gold Medal Award, 1997
- Charles Nypels Award for Excellence in Typography, 1998
- Honorary members of the Society of Typographic Arts, Chicago, 2010
- Society of Typographic Aficionados Annual Typography Award, 2013
- 29th New York Type Directors Club Medal, 2016

== Exhibitions ==
=== Solo exhibitions ===
- Emigre Magazine: Selections from the Permanent Collection, Museum of Modern Art, San Francisco, 1997
- Charles Nypels Prize, Jan van Eyck Academy, Maastricht, Netherlands, 1998
- "Emigre in Istanbul2, Contemporary Art Center, Istanbul, Turkey, 1999
- Emigre in Norfolk, Old Dominion University Gallery, Norfolk, Virginia, 2005
- Emigre at Gallery 16", Gallery 16, San Francisco, 2010
- "Emigre magazine: design, discourse and authorship", University of Reading, UK, 2017.

=== General exhibitions ===
- Pacific Wave: California Graphic Design, Museo Fortuny, Venice, Italy, 1987
- Graphic Design in America, Walker Art Center, Minneapolis, 1989
- Mixing Messages: Graphic Design in Contemporary Culture," Cooper-Hewitt National Design Museum, 1996
- "Designer as Author, Voices and Visions," Northern Kentucky University, 1996
- Design Culture Now: National Design Triennial, Cooper-Hewitt National Design Museum, 2000
- East Coast/West Coast at Centre du Graphisme, Echirolles, France, 2002
- D-Day:le design aujourd'hui, at Centre Pompidou, Paris, 2005
- Digitally Mastered, MoMA, New York, 2007
- Quick, Quick, Slow, Experimentadesign Lisboa 2009, Berardo Collection Museum, Lisbon, Portugal, 2009 (featured Emigre magazine issues10–24)
- Typographic Tables, Museum of Modern and Contemporary Art, Bolzano, Italy, 2011
- Deep Surface: Contemporary Ornament and Pattern, Contemporary Art Museum, Raleigh, 2011
- Graphic Design: Now in Production, Walker Art Center, Minneapolis, 2011 (featured "Emigre No. 70: The Look Back Issue" and Base 900)
- Postmodernism: Style and Subversion 1970–1990, Victoria & Albert Museum, London, 2011
- Standard Deviations, MoMA, New York, 2011 (featured 23 digital typefaces for its permanent collection, including five Emigre font families: Jeffery Keedy's Keedy Sans, Jonathan Barnbrook's Mason Serif, Barry Deck's Template Gothic, Zuzana Licko's Oakland—renamed Lo-Res in 2001—and P. Scott Makela's Dead History)
- Work from California, 25th International Biennial of Graphic Design, Brno, Czech Republic, 2012
- Revolution/Evolution, College for Creative Studies, Detroit, 2014
- Typeface to Interface, Museum of Modern Art, San Francisco, 2016
- California Graphic Design, 1975–95, Los Angeles County Museum of Art, Los Angeles, 2018
- "Between the Lines: Typography in LACMA's Collection," Los Angeles County Museum of Art, Los Angeles, 2019

== Collections ==
- Denver Art Museum holds a complete set of Emigre magazine in its permanent collection
- Design Museum in London holds a complete set of Emigre magazine in its permanent collection
- Letterform Archive holds the Emigre Archives in its permanent collection
- Museum of Design, Zürich holds Emigre magazine issues in its permanent collection
- Museum of Modern Art in New York holds a complete set of Emigre magazine, and five digital fonts from the Emigre Fonts library in its permanent collection
- Museum of Modern Art in San Francisco holds a complete set of Emigre magazine in its permanent collection
- Lubba Cultura Visual in São Paulo holds a complete set of Emigre magazine in its permanent collection

== See also ==
- Emigre Fonts
- Zuzana Licko
- Rudy VanderLans
- Eye (magazine)
- Print (magazine)
- Communication Arts
- Graphis Inc.
- Visible Language
