= Exocet (disambiguation) =

Exocet is a type of anti-ship missile. Exocet may also mean:

- In older English literature there are some uses of "exocet" to mean "flying fish"
- Exocet (typeface) is a typeface
- Exocet (car) is a kit car produced by MEV Ltd
- Ellyas Pical (boxer) is nicknamed "the Exocet" referring to his strong left hand compared to the missile popular at his era

== In biology ==
- Biological names for flying-fish:
  - Exocoetus
  - Exocoetidae

== See also ==
- XOC or xoc
- An exosuit is a powered exoskeleton
