= Emigre =

Emigre may refer to:

- Émigré, a person who has emigrated
- Émigré (album), the debut solo studio album by Australian singer-songwriter Wendy Matthews
- Emigre (magazine), a graphic design magazine
- Emigre (type foundry), a digital type foundry
- Émigré (oratorio), 2023 oratorio with music by Aaron Zigman
