= Barnbrook =

Barnbrook is an English surname. Notable people with the surname include:

- Jonathan Barnbrook (born 1966), British graphic designer, film maker, and typographer
- Richard Barnbrook (1961–2026), British politician
