= Yale (typeface) =

- Category: Serif
- Classification: Old style serif
- Designer: Matthew Carter
- Commissioned by: Yale University
- Foundry: Carter & Cone
- Date released: 2004

Yale is an old style serif typeface designed by Matthew Carter and first released in 2004. It was commissioned by Yale University for use in all of its signage, promotional and internal material.

In 2010, Yale was named one of the "Ten Typefaces of the Decade" by Print magazine. It is influenced by Bembo, a popular book typeface by Monotype, and is also similar to Carter's previous ITC Galliard.

== Design ==
Carter, who has taught at the Yale School of Art since 1976, currently holding the rank of Senior Critic, was asked to design a universal typeface for Yale University by John Gambell, the University Printer. Yale was first designed for signage on all Yale University buildings. Carter's first priority was therefore readability, as well as a balance between dignity and uniqueness. Carter has said that this was the first time in designing a typeface that he focused more on capital than lowercase letters, since he knew that on the building signs the lettering would be in capitals. Carter describes:

The signs, whether free-standing or attached to walls, reminded me of inscriptions, and this led me to think about the inscriptional origins of Roman caps and the everlasting problem of reconciling capitals with lowercase. For me, the moment when the first true synthesis occurred was in the type of De Aetna. This led me in turn to the Beinecke Library to pore over their copy of the book and its type—the archetype of Roman type for me.

The late 15th century De Aetna typeface, cut by Francesco Griffo for Aldus Manutius, served as a basis for Yale, with elements of one of Carter's earlier typefaces, Galliard. Some of Yale's unique characteristics are its curved leg of the "h", its flat-topped "A", its open apertures of the "c" and "e", and the bent tops of its lowercase ascenders.

== Variants ==
Although originally developed for use in signage, several variants have been added to the Yale family for use in print and on the web:

- Yale Administrative is intended for informational rather than promotional use, such as in memos, newsletters and reports.
- Yale Design is intended for use in publications with “institutional and promotional significance,” such as websites, books, annual reports, posters and invitations. Unlike the Administrative face, the Design face has a full set of ligatures and old-style numerals.
- Yale Display is intended for use in display type at large sizes for use in print and on the web.
- Yale Small Capitals is a small caps face for use in print and on the web.
- Yale Street was designed for use in campus signage. It is heavier, bigger and more widely spaced than the print faces.

In 2013, Carter & Cone—Carter's type foundry—was commissioned by Yale to compile OpenType versions of the print faces, renamed to prevent confusion—“YaleNew.” These fonts were delivered in July 2014. They have replaced the earlier version of the typeface, described above, in the download package available to the Yale community. In addition to converting the typeface to the OpenType format, Carter reorganized the family and supplemented its fonts with additional accented characters, floating accents, a complete set of f-ligatures, true fractions, lowercase Greek characters, and manicules (fists). Carter developed these from hands found in a woodcut illustration in the Hypnerotomachia Polifili, published in 1499 by Aldus Manutius. All YaleNew fonts include the Yale logo, the Yale Shield, and the words “University” and “College” as single glyphs adjusted to visually coordinate with the Yale logo.

- YaleNew Roman incorporates the character sets and features of the Yale Administrative (“Yale Admin”), Yale Design Roman, and Yale Small Capitals (roman) listed above along with Greek lowercase characters (accessible from this YaleNew font only).
- YaleNew Italic mirrors the character set of YaleNew Roman.
- YaleNew Bold also mirrors the character set of YaleNew Roman.
- YaleNew Bold Italic does not include small caps but otherwise mirrors the character set of the YaleNew family.

In 2024, Carter & Cone further expanded the typeface to include "additional characters for use in the transcription/transliteration of languages with non-Latin writing systems". This new version was named "Yale 2024".

== Usage ==
Yale is the primary typeface used in all of the university's signs and promotional materials. The Yale Daily News notes that “Even leaving aside the signs and brochures, the typeface is everywhere: from business cards to displays at the Yale University Art Gallery, from cocktail napkins to Economics problem sets.” In 2007 the Yale logo was redesigned with the new Yale typeface. Yale University Press began using the new Yale logo in 2009, replacing the distinctive, modern, circular logo designed by Paul Rand and first used in 1985.

In 2008, the Yale typeface became available for free download to all Yale employees and students.

== Similar typefaces ==
Bembo has itself been digitised, first as Bembo and then in a second (generally considered superior) version as Bembo Book, with a caps-only display font Bembo Titling sold separately. A looser interpretation praised by Carter is Iowan Old Style, designed by John Downer and published by Carter's company Bitstream. With a large x-height and influences of signpainting, it was intended to be particularly readable, especially in book text and (in the bolder weights) on signage. It is a default font in Apple's iBooks application and OS X. Cardo is a loose open-source adaptation of Bembo intended for signage. None of these designs has optical sizes intended for different sizes of text, as Yale has.

== See also ==
- Yale Blue
