= Taigi =

Taigi can refer to

- Blessed Anna Maria Taigi (born Anna Maria Giannetti; 1769–1837), Italian Roman Catholic professed member from the Secular Trinitarians
- Taiwanese Hokkien, known as Tâi-gí, Tâi-gú, Tâi-gṳ́ (POJ) or Tâi-gír (Tâi-lô)
  - Taigi Unicode, a TrueType font designed to display Pe̍h-ōe-jī, a romanization for Hokkien
- Taygi or Taigi, a dialect of the Mator language
- All-Japan Taigi Competition
