= Matrix (typeface) =

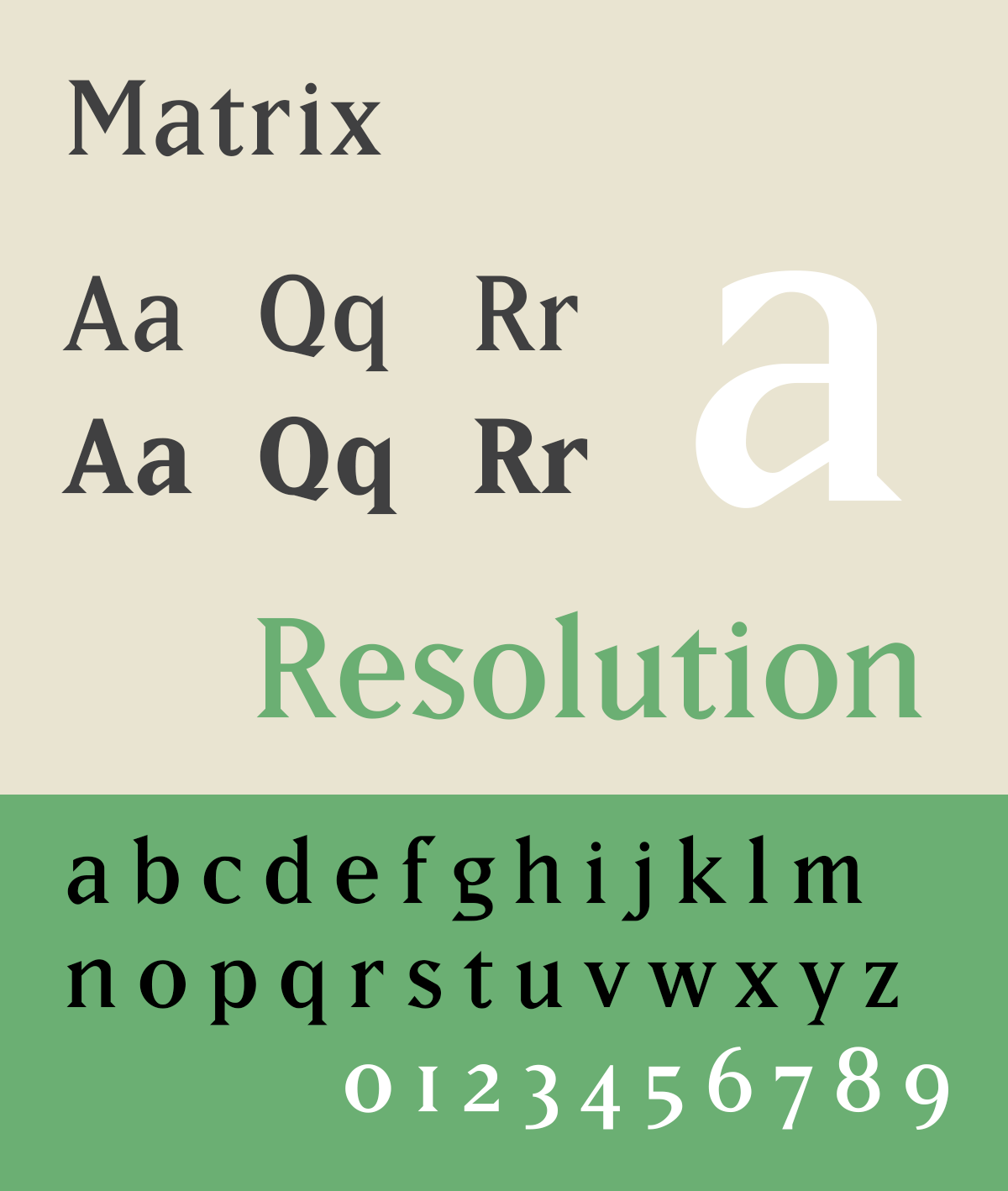
- Category: Serif
- Classification: Geometric
- Designer: Zuzana Licko
- Foundry: Emigre
- Date created: 1986
- Variations: Matrix II OT, Matrix Tall, Matrix Inline, Matrix Script

Matrix is a contemporary serif typeface designed by Zuzana Licko and released by Emigre in 1986. Matrix's proportions were derived from several of Licko's early bitmap fonts released for the early Macintosh. The geometric character of those bitmap fonts were created in order to overcome the constraints of the Mac and coarse resolution laser printers. Soon after their creation, Matrix, the first PostScript font, was released.

Emigre, a digital type foundry based in California started by husband-and-wife type design team Zuzana Licko and Rudy VanderLans, released the initial weights, book, regular, and bold, in 1986. Later in 1992, small caps were added to all the weights, and several decorative styles were added, including Matrix Script and Matrix Inline.

The typeface grew rapidly popular very quickly, and became one of Emigre's all-time best-sellers, followed by Mrs Eaves. FontShop listed Matrix as the "21st best typeface of all time" in their book '100 Best Typefaces Ever', published in January 2007.

== Description ==
As computer software on Mac computers advanced in the early to mid-1980s, hardware found it difficult to keep up. With the limited number of computers people could afford, there was a lack of memory space, processing power, rasterizers, and output devices. Matrix was built on a few basic ratios to solve this problem and save as much computer memory as possible.

The points needed to define the letter forms were restricted to the necessities. As a result, Matrix got its unique triangular serifs within its geometric form, which uses fewer points than square or curved serifs. Additionally, the smoothest diagonals that digital printers could produce were 45 degrees. This allowed Matrix to print using comparatively little memory space in printers of the time.

In a 1986 interview with Zuzana Licko, she comments about Matrix's design and the reason for its creation: “My aim is to explore two things. First of all, I like to experiment with what the computer can do with things that were not possible with other technologies. I like to design letter forms that work well with the computer, both for pragmatic reasons and stylistic reasons. My other aim when designing typefaces is to see how much the basic letter shapes can be changed and still be functional, like the lower case 'g'.”

== Re-design ==
In January 2007, the demand for an OpenType version of Matrix led to the start of a re-design called 'Matrix II', and it is this version of Matrix that much of the world still uses today. Licko made many adjustments and refined numerous glyphs that were made in the mid-80s. The contrast between the thick and thin strokes were reduced, and many of the font's overshoots were soon corrected. The width of different characters were also tweaked. The crossbar on the lowercase 'f' was normalized across the different weights. The design of the lowercase 'g' was also changed, and a single-story glyph was created in the new version.

The new Matrix family gained several new fonts, including a semi narrow, semi wide, semi tall, inline italic, along with three italic weights matching the proportions of Matrix Script.

== Usage ==
In the realm of film and television, Matrix has seen significant use, especially with title sequences created in the late 90s and 2000s for major releases. Title studio Pacific Title & Art Studio used it for 1995's Balto, designer Robert Dawson used it for 1992's Batman Returns, studio Picture Mill used it for the end credits of Disney's Dinosaur, and Cinema Research Corporation used it for 1996's Wish Upon A Star. Matrix was also used in poster and marketing material, for example 1998's Blade and 1995's Goldeneye.

Matrix is also the typeface used for Yu-Gi-Oh! Trading Card Game cards in western languages (English, French, German, Italian, Portuguese, and Spanish), with the card names using a small caps variant.

In recent years, Matrix is commonly seen on book covers, such as the Portuguese book Una mela al giorno and Avid Reader Press' 2024 release A Short Walk Through The Wide World. It also appeared on the cover of New Zealand NetGuide, Issue 00 in September 1996.

In 2014, nhow hotel in Rotterdam in the Netherlands used the script weight of Matrix as their corporate logo.
