= Positive (The Grassy Knoll album) =

Studio album by the Grassy Knoll
- Released: 1996
- Genre: Jazz, jazz fusion
- Label: Antilles/Verve
- Producer: Bob Green, Jaime Lagueruela

The Grassy Knoll chronology
The Grassy Knoll (1995)	Positive (1996)	The Grassy Knoll III (1998)

Positive is an album by the American band the Grassy Knoll, released in 1996. They promoted the album by touring with 16volt.

== Production ==
Recorded in San Antonio and San Francisco, the album was produced by Bob Green and Jaime Lagueruela. In assembling the band, frontman Green was more concerned with finding musicians who could follow conceptual, not technical, direction. Green would have the musicians record their parts, and would then edit, manipulate, and remix the tracks with Lagueruela; Green also played keyboards, guitar, and bass. "Black Helicopters" samples Led Zeppelin's version of "When the Levee Breaks".

== Critical reception ==
Professional ratings
Review scores
Source	Rating
AllMusic	3/5 stars
Los Angeles Times	1.5/4 stars
MusicHound Rock: The Essential Album Guide	2.5/5 stars
Orlando Sentinel	4/5 stars
Vancouver Sun	3/4 stars

The Orlando Sentinel wrote that, "like the best ambient music, it works both in the background and as the object of intense attention... But even in the background, the Grassy Knoll is not exactly quiet and soothing." Guitar Player stated: "Replete with hypnotic grooves and outer-fringe guitar loops, Positive ... abounds with compelling sonic tapestries." The Chicago Tribune determined that the band "swaddles hip-hop rhythms in a Technicolor dreamcoat of cool jazz, metal ax riffs, ambient sound and tape mangling."

The Los Angeles Times thought that "titles like 'Black Helicopters', 'Roswell Crash' and 'Fall of the American Empire' seem to be all of one mood, with only the occasional trumpet solo emerging from the hypnotic beats." The Times Colonist noted that "Milesian trumpet floats like a spooky echo above Zeppelin-inspired guitar and a textural framework that marries Public Enemy's apocalyptic noise to Tricky's spaced-out, transcendent grooves." The Oregonian praised the "well-crafted album full of samples and darkly ethereal funk-rock overtones."

AllMusic wrote: "Time and changes in sampling/hip-hop aesthetics rendered the Grassy Knoll's work less cutting-edge and more representative of a phase but, for all that, Positive succeeds as an enjoyable if slightly stiff exploration of jazz-meets-breakbeat culture."

== Track listing ==
No.	Title	Length
1.	"Black Helicopters"
2.	"Driving Nowhere"
3.	"Slow Steady Salvation"
4.	"1961"
5.	"The Americans"
6.	"Roswell Crash"
7.	"The Common Good"
8.	"Another Theory"
9.	"Wailing and Gnashing of Teeth"
10.	"Fall of the American Empire"
11.	"All Things Considered"
12.	"Corrosion of the Masses"
13.	"End of It All"
