= Triplex (typeface) =

Triplex Sans
- Category: Sans-serif
- Designer(s): Zuzana Licko
- Foundry: Emigre
- Date released: 1989
- Design based on: Triplex Italic by John Downer
- Variations: Triplex Serif, Triplex Italic

The Triplex type font style is a typeface designed by Zuzana Licko and John Downer in 1985 and 1989. It is distributed by Emigre. It is used by Avex & Prezi for its logo. It was also used as the typeface for Disney Channel from 1997-2002. It has both Sans-serif and Serif variation.

John Downer first designed sans-serif Triplex Italic in 1985, then Zuzana Licko designed the other fonts in the family, including Triplex Sans and Triplex Serif.

== Variations ==
=== Sans-serif ===
The list below is all the sans-serif variations of Triplex typeface.

- Normal width:
  - Triplex Sans Light
  - Triplex Sans Bold
  - Triplex Sans Extra Bold
- Condensed width:
  - Triplex Condensed Sans Regular
  - Triplex Condensed Sans Black
- Italic:
  - Triplex Italic Light
  - Triplex Italic Bold
  - Triplex Italic Extra Bold

=== Serif ===
The list below is all the Serif variations of Triplex typeface.

- Normal width:
  - Triplex Serif Light
  - Triplex Serif Bold
  - Triplex Serif Extra Bold
- Condensed width:
  - Triplex Condensed Serif Regular
  - Triplex Condensed Serif Black

== See also ==
- Emigre (type foundry)
- Zuzana Licko
