= Berling Type Foundry =

Berlingska Stilgjuteri
- Industry: Type foundry
- Founded: 1700s
- Defunct: 1980
- Headquarters: Sweden
- Key people: Karl-Erik Forsberg

The Berling Type Foundry was a Danish type foundry established before 1750 in Copenhagen. Johann Gottfried Pöetzsch was manager of the Berling typefoundry from 1753 until his death in 1783. The foundry was reëstablished in Lund, Sweden in 1837 and cast foundry type until 1980.

== Typefaces ==
These foundry types were produced by the Berling Foundry:

- Berling (1951-58, Karl-Erik Forsberg)
- Berling Kort-Versaler (1951-58, Albert Augspurg)
- Carolus (1954, Karl-Erik Forsberg)
- Garamond (Henri Alm), based on the ATF design of 1917.
- Lunda (1941, Karl-Erik Forsberg)
- Parad (1938, Karl-Erik Forsberg)
