= Laurie Haycock Makela =

American graphic designer and educator (born 1956)

Laurie Haycock Makela (born 1956) is an American graphic designer and educator. She co-chaired the design program at Cranbrook Academy of Art in the 1990s along with her husband, P. Scott Makela. Both were honored with the AIGA medal in 2000.

== Early life ==
Haycock was born in Los Angeles and grew up in Los Angeles’ San Fernando Valley. After earning a bachelor's degree in English and visual communications at the University of California at Berkeley, she attended the graduate program at the Rhode Island School of Design (RISD).

== Career ==
After studying at RISD for a year, Haycock Makela returned to Los Angeles. She began teaching at the Otis College of Art and Design where she met her future husband, P. Scott Makela. The encounter resulted in a 14-year partnership that “produced—much as when you mix water with gelatin and fruit flavors—more than the sum of its parts.” The couple brought their talents together to form their first of several design studios, Combine, along with partner Paul Knickelbine. Clients for Combine included a range of southern California cultural institutions from the Los Angeles County Museum of Art (LACMA) to the Getty and the Museum of Contemporary Art (MOCA). In addition to running Combine, the couple taught at the California Institute of the Arts (CalArts). At CalArts, Haycock Makela and her husband fostered an innovative and exploratory classroom environment where the "Swiss Grid was discarded in pieces on the floor.” In 1990, the Makelas closed their Los Angeles studio and headed to Michigan to study in the graduate program at Cranbrook Academy of Art. At the time, Cranbrook's design program, headed by Katherine McCoy, was a hot bed of design experimentation focused on theories of post-structuralism.

=== Walker Art Center ===
After completing her studies at Cranbrook, Haycock Makela accepted a position as design director at the Walker Art Center in Minneapolis. In addition to designing artists catalogues and exhibition materials, she revamped the museum's institutional identity. In 1994, Haycock Makela commissioned type designer Matthew Carter to create a radically new display typeface for the museum, appropriately named Walker. The typeface was intended to break with modernist aesthetics to create an instantly recognizable identity for the museum, independent of a traditional logo. The font featured flexible ‘snap-on’ serifs that offered multiple typographic variations while maintaining a consistent visual image. During this period, Haycock Makela collaborated with Ellen Lupton to pen “Underground Matriarchy,” a fax discussion published in Eye Magazine. The article was important in defining the roles of women in design and forwarding a case for a feminist canon in design. Haycock Makela is noted for applying her talent as a visual communicator to raise awareness about issues related to women in design and to mentor other women designers.

=== Cranbrook Academy of Art ===
In 1996, the Makelas were invited to co-chair the 2-D graduate design program at Cranbrook after Katherine and Michael McCoy left the school. As co-chairs, the Makelas continued McCoy's legacy of innovation by focusing on visual and technological explorations that examined the roles of new media and digital print design. In a statement to prospective students they promised to create “new interplays between reader, writer, and text,” The couple also jointly ran their design studio, Words + Pictures for Business + Culture. Around this time, Haycock Makela experienced—and recovered—from a brain hemorrhage. In 1998, the Makelas, along with co-author Lewis Blackwell, published Whereishere, a print-website publication that upended traditional understanding of 2-D design. In 1999, P. Scott Makela suddenly died as a result of a rare infection.

=== Post Cranbrook ===
Haycock Makela continued to teach at Cranbrook until 2001 when she moved to Los Angeles to accept a position as chair the graphic design program at the Art Center College of Design. In 2003, Haycock Makela experienced her second brain hemorrhage. In 2019, she participated in and designed the catalogue for the Dallas Museum of Art’s exhibition, Speechless: Different by Design.

=== Publications and exhibits ===
- Whereishere. P. Scott Makela, Laurie Haycock Makela, Lewis Blackwell. 1998. Gingko Pr Inc.
- “Underground Matriarchy” Laurie Haycock Makela, Ellen Lupton. Autumn 1994. Eye Magazine.
- “Three New Faces,” Laurie Haycock Makela, Winter 1993, Design Quarterly, Walker Art Center.
- “Speechless: Different by Design,” Dallas Museum of Art. November 10, 2019 to March 22, 2020.

=== Awards and honors ===
In 2000, Laurie Haycock and P. Scott Makela were awarded the AIGA medal. While the couple was recognized for their contributions to design education, Haycock Makela was called out specifically for “her thoughtful experimentalism and refined typography.”
