= Jeffery Keedy =

American graphic designer

Jeffery Keedy, born 1957, is an American graphic designer, type designer, writer and educator. He is notable as an essayist and contributor to books and periodicals on graphic design. He is also notable for the design of Keedy Sans, a typeface acquired in the permanent collection of the Museum of Modern Art in 2011.

== Biography ==
A 1985 graduate of the Cranbrook Academy of Art, Keedy has been teaching design at the California Institute of the Arts (CalArts) since his graduation. Keedy was also a frequent contributor to Emigre magazine throughout the twenty years of its publication. His designs and essays have been published in Eye, I.D., Emigre, Critique, Idea, Adbusters, Looking Closer One and Two, Faces on the Edge: Type in the Digital Age, New Design: Los Angeles and The Education of a Graphic Designer.

His typeface Keedy Sans, designed in 1989, is distributed through Emigre Fonts. “Jeffery Keedy described his design of Hard Times as an “ironic commentary” on classic typefaces. Whether the font was truly ironic—its name conjures up not only a typeface but also Charles Dickens and the Great Depression—or just the result of someone goofing around with Fontographer is immaterial. Either way, Keedy’s alteration of Times New Roman—hacking off and reassembling serifs and other parts—encouraged a whole slew of typographic mutilations in the 1990s (including fonts “designed” for advertising campaigns for Putnam Investments and Air France).” Juan Pablo Mejía (2011). In the mid 1980s he was a proponent of the view that design should be looked at as a cultural practice connected to themes of popular culture than a problem solving one.

== Books ==
- With Rudy VanderLans, Zuzana Licko, Mary E. Gray, Emigre: Graphic Design into the Digital Realm, Van Nostrand Reinhold, 1993. (ISBN 978-0442013806)

== Articles ==
- Graphic Design in the Postmodern Era, Emigre 47: Relocating Design, edited by Rudy VanderLans, 1998. (Full text available online. )
- The Rules of Typography According to (Crackpots) Experts, Eye, No. 11, Vol. 3, edited by Rick Poynor, Wordsearch Ltd, London, 1993.

== See also ==
- First Things First 2000 manifesto
- Emigre 51: First Things First, 1999.
