= MS Serif =

Raster typeface included with Microsoft Windows

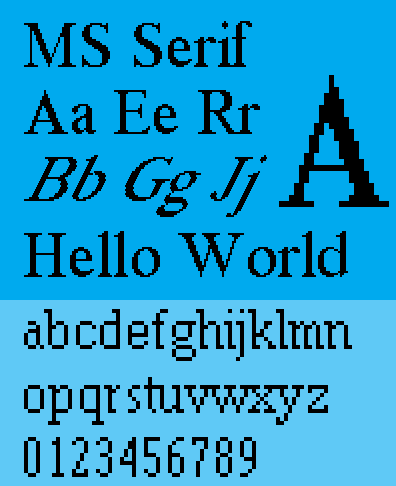
- Category: Serif
- Designer(s): Microsoft
- Date created: 1985 (as Tms Rmn); 1992 (as MS Serif)

MS Serif is a raster typeface packaged with Microsoft Windows. It was introduced in Windows 1.x as "Tms Rmn" (which is shortened to Times Roman), and changed to its current name starting with Windows 3.1 (just as "Helv" became MS Sans Serif).

== See also ==
- Times New Roman
