= City (typeface) =

Berthold City
- Category: Serif
- Classification: Slab-serif
- Designer: Georg Trump
- Foundry: H. Berthold AG
- Date released: c. 1930

Title page for Tschichold's Typographische Gestaltung using City Medium, for the Benno Schwabe & Co. publishing house, 1932.

City is a slab serif typeface designed by Georg Trump and released around 1930 by the Berthold type foundry in Berlin, Germany. (Note: Different sources have claimed 1930 and 1931.) Though classified as a slab serif, City displays a strong modernist influence in its geometric structure of right angles and opposing round corners. The typeface takes inspiration from the machine age, and industry. A consistent application of repeated parts: an outer circle softening interior rectilinear spaces, results in a highly unified and refined typeface.

The lowercase a is composed of a two horizontal rectangles in the interior, the outer skin follows the counter but always contrasting the outer stroke with the organic curves. The face was produced in three weights: light, medium, and bold, each in roman and italic. The graphic designer Jan Tschichold helped to popularize the City typeface by his use of it for his book Typographische Gestaltung published by the Basel publishing house Benno Schwabe & Co.

== Commercial uses ==
- IBM Corporation used variations of City for their corporate logo from 1956 onward and used City Medium on the title pages and covers of their technical manuals for several decades.
- Southern Television used City for titling in their news programme Day by Day.
- The 1998 anime series Cowboy Bebop used City for its title sequence.
- One variant of this typeface was also used for the titles and credits of the CBS crime drama series, Mannix.
- For several years until 2015, ESPN used City Pro Bold to brand its college football and basketball coverage; ESPN has since used it solely for the latter.
- Italian Air Force (Aeronautica Militare) used City Bold typeface for their logo.
- Australia's BBL and WBBL T20 Cricket Tournaments used City for their branding up until 2019. The font is still used in the tournaments' logo.
- The American restaurant chain Raising Cane’s uses the typeface on their box combos.

== City Pro ==
In 2007–09, Berthold released an OpenType Pro version of City called City Pro, which supports Central European, Latin Extended A characters. OpenType features include ordinals, proportional lining figures, subscripts and superscripts, fractions.

== Square Slabserif 711 ==
The Square Slabserif 711 font from Bitstream is very similar to City and is available in light, medium, and bold weights. The Square Slabserif 711 also support Greek and Cyrillic.

== See also ==
- Cholla Slab
