= Letterform Archive =

Museum and archive in San Francisco

- Location within San Francisco County
- Established: 2014
- Location: 2325 Third St Floor 4R; San Francisco, CA 94107
- Coordinates: 37.7601°N 122.3883°W
- Founder: Rob Saunders
- Website: https://letterformarchive.org

Letterform Archive is a non-profit museum and special collections library in San Francisco, California dedicated to collecting materials on the history of lettering, typography, printing, and graphic design. It is curated by graphic designer Rob Saunders, who founded the museum with his private collection of "books, periodicals, maquettes, posters, and other ephemera" in 2014. The museum opened in February 2015 with 15,000 items. It moved to a larger space in 2020. Guests can visit the gallery exhibition during regular open hours, or schedule tours or research visits by appointment.

== Collection ==
As of 2020, the Archive’s collection totals over 100,000 items. The Archive acquired the private collection of Dutch collector Jan Tholenaar in 2015. In 2016, the Archive acquired over 200 wood type prints from local printer and typographer Jack Stauffacher. Emigre Graphics also donated a large collection of their work, including interviews, printed sheets, posters, paste ups, ephemera, and the entire collection of Emigre magazine, that year.

The Archive launched their digital archive of nearly 1,500 works and 9,000 images to the general public in 2019.

== Exhibitions ==
The Archive presented the “Without Type: The Dynamism of Handmade Letters” exhibit with the San Francisco Center for the Book from January 22 to April 3, 2016.

In 2020, the Archive moved to the Dogpatch neighborhood of San Francisco. The custom-built, expanded space at the American Industrial Center complex provided, for the first time, an exhibition gallery where highlights from the collection are on display during regular open hours. The first three shows showcased Bauhaus typography, protest graphics, and graffiti zines.

== Publishing ==
The Archive publishes books about the material in its collection, including: the work of W. A. Dwiggins, as a full-length biography by Bruce Kennett in 2017; the work of Jennifer Morla, written and designed by Morla in 2019; the prints of Jack Stauffacher, edited and designed by Chuck Byrne in 2020; and The Complete Commercial Artist compiling the 1928–1930 Japanese design publication. Letterform Archive Books also include catalogs of exhibitions from the organization’s gallery, including Bauhaus Typography at 100 and Strikethrough: Typographic Messages of Protest. In 2023, the imprint launched a facsimile series starting with Die Fläche (Facsimile Edition): Design and Lettering of the Vienna Secession, 1902–1911.

== Education ==
The Archive has an education program (previously in collaboration with Cooper Union) which includes Type West, a full-year certificate program in typeface design, workshops on lettering and typography, and a lecture series.

The Archive often hosts workshops and lectures. They have previously hosted type workshops by typeface designers Cyrus Highsmith and Sumner Stone, calligraphy workshops with Lynne Yun, and sign painting workshops by Better Letters Co. Visiting lecturers include Irma Boom, Emory Douglas, Steve Heller, Susan Kare, and Saki Mafundikwa.
