= Karl-Erik Forsberg =

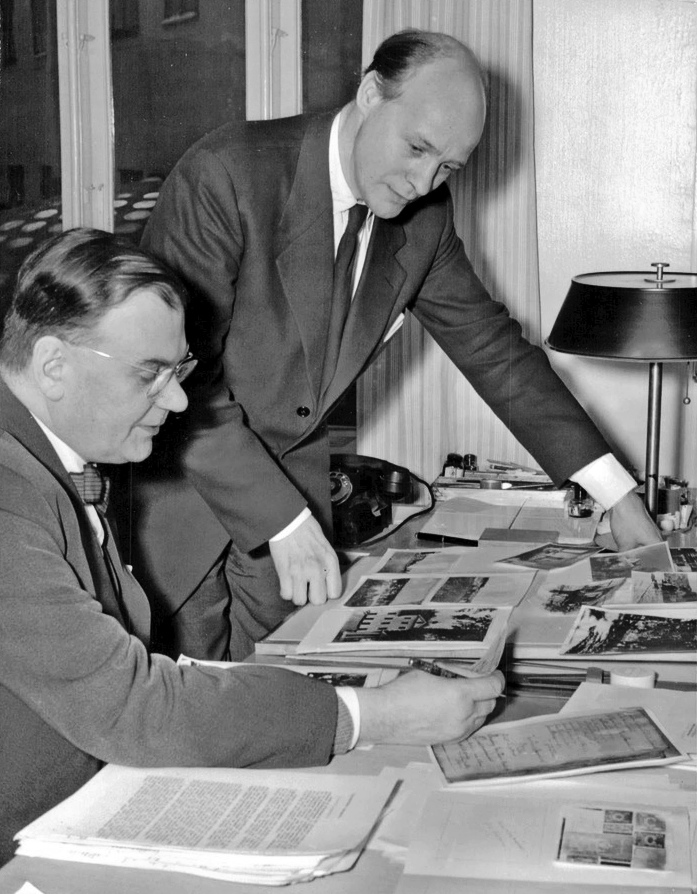
The director of the Riksbank's paper mill in Tumba and the artist Karl-Erik Forsberg at Nordstedts examine the pictures in the anniversary book.

Karl-Erik Forsberg (1914–1995) was a Swedish calligrapher, typographer, graphic designer, type designer and artist. His brother Vidar Forsberg was also a designer. His wife was Geith Forsberg.

Forsberg was the artistic director of Almqvist & Wiksell 1942-50 and at Norstedts 1950, where he designed books. Bibeln med bilder av Rembrandt (Bible with pictures by Rembrandt) (1954) is one of Forsberg's great achievements as a designer. The book was one of the first set with Forsberg's own typeface Berling antikva (1951). Forsberg created several typefaces, including Parry (1938), Lunda (1941) and Carolus (1953), as well as logos for a number of Swedish companies, such as Swedish Radio, Volvo, Royal Library and the University of Stockholm and created the image of Stockholm City Arms that the City of Stockholm's use in its graphic identity. Forsberg also published several books: Exlibris, monogram och andra märken (Bookplates, monograms and other markings) (1981) and Mina bokstäver (My letters) (1983), Vandring bland bokstavsformer (Wandering among the letter forms) (1992) and others. In 1983 Forsberg received an honorary doctorate from the Faculty of Humanities at Uppsala University, Sweden. On his 75th birthday in 1989 the Forsberg Berling Prize was instituted, awarded to a Swedish graphic artist every year since 1991.

In 1965, he designed a text-only diploma for winners of the Nobel Prize in Physiology or Medicine.

== Books ==
- Berling antikva (1952)
- Antiqua. Vandring bland bokstavsformer (Walk in the letter forms ) (1957)
- Exlibris, monogram och andra märken (Bookplates, monograms and other markings ) (1981, together with Geith Forsberg)
- Bokstaven i mitt liv (The letter in my life ) (1982)
- Mina bokstäver (My letters) (1983, together with Geith Forsberg)
- Skrift. Handledning i kalligrafi (Writing. Guide to Calligraphy) (1986)
- Bokstaven och ordet (1990, together with Geith Forsberg)
- Vandring bland bokstavsformer (Wandering among the letter forms) (1992, together with Geith Forsberg)
- Alpha Magica (Alpha Lantern) (1994, together with Geith Forsberg)
- Bokstaven som konst (The letter as art) (1996)

== Typefaces designed by Forsberg ==
These foundry types were produced by Karl-Erik Forsberg:

- Ballong (1932, not released)
- Parad (1938, Berling Type Foundry)
- Lunda (1941, Berling Type Foundry)
- Berling antikva (1951-1958, Berling Type Foundry)
- Carolus (1954, Berling Type Foundry)
