= Cholla Slab =

Typeface

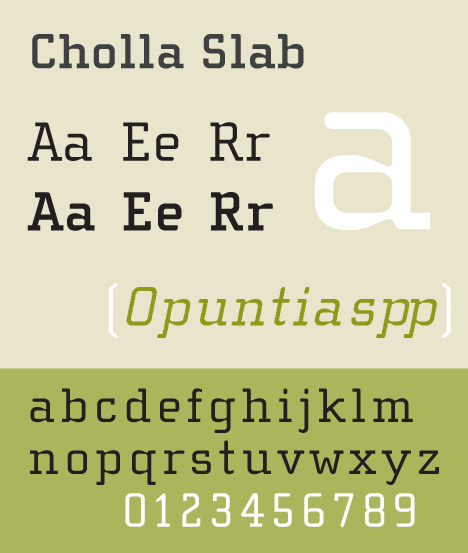
- Category: Sans-serif
- Classification: Slab-serif
- Designer(s): Sibylle Hagmann
- Foundry: Emigre
- Date released: 1998–1999

Cholla Slab is a geometric slab-serif variant of a larger typeface family called Cholla, designed by Sibylle Hagmann between 1998 and 1999 for the Art Center College of Design. Cholla is licensed by the Emigre foundry. The typeface is named for a group of cactus species indigenous to the Mojave Desert.

The family is distinct for maintaining a highly unified design across weights and the serif and sans serif variants while allowing for a wide range of variation in form and counter-form across the family. Similarities in structure can be found with the 1930 Berthold foundry typeface, "City".

The typeface family has been awarded by both the Type Directors Club of New York and the Association Typographique Internationale (ATypI).
