= Exocet (typeface) =

- Category: Display
- Designer: Jonathan Barnbrook
- Foundry: Emigre
- Date created: 1991
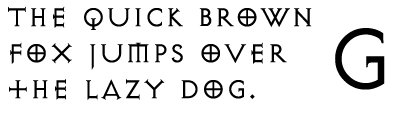
- Sample

Exocet is a decorative serif typeface designed by the British typographer Jonathan Barnbrook for the Emigre foundry in 1991. It was originally designed for the European annual series Illustration Now.

Qoppa, inspiration for the font's Q

The font is inspired by ancient incised Greek and Roman letter carvings, with geometric shapes used for the main construction. For example, its stylized Q is based on qoppa, an ancient form of Q. The O with a cross is an early form of theta.

It is an all-capital font, but with different capital glyphs for both lowercase and capital letters. However, the only letter that has visually distinct forms is T, with the lowercase t being a cross.

== Variants ==
It is available in "light" and "heavy" varieties. There is no italic.

A sans version of the font from the same designer, called Patriot, was released in 1997.

== Notable uses ==
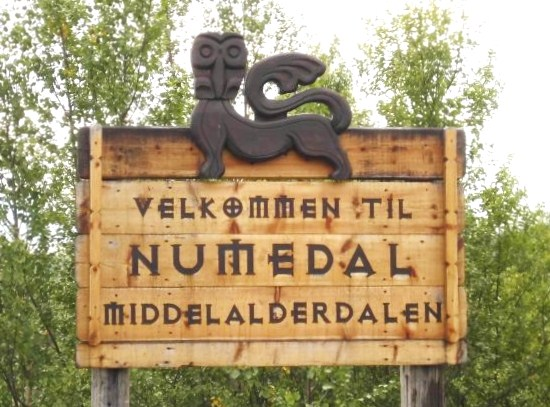
A welcome sign in Norway using the Exocet font

It was used extensively for product designs in the 1990s, most notably for the American tea company Tazo. It was also used on the album cover of Donald Fagen's 1993 album Kamakiriad. It can be seen in the 1993 movie Demolition Man where it is used extensively in the museum scene. It was also used in the film Dogma, the film The Big Lebowski, the film Star Trek Nemesis, the Dungeons & Dragons campaign setting Planescape, the English translation of the Korean manhwa Priest, the Diablo computer game series, the Double Switch full motion video game, and the Sony PlayStation scrolling shooter game Einhänder.

== See also ==
- Samples of display typefaces
