= Xoc =

XOC or similar can mean:

- Lady Xoc, a Maya Queen consort in Yaxchilan
- A Mayan word for "fish".

== Distinguish from ==
- Exocet
