= Iowan Old Style =

Typeface

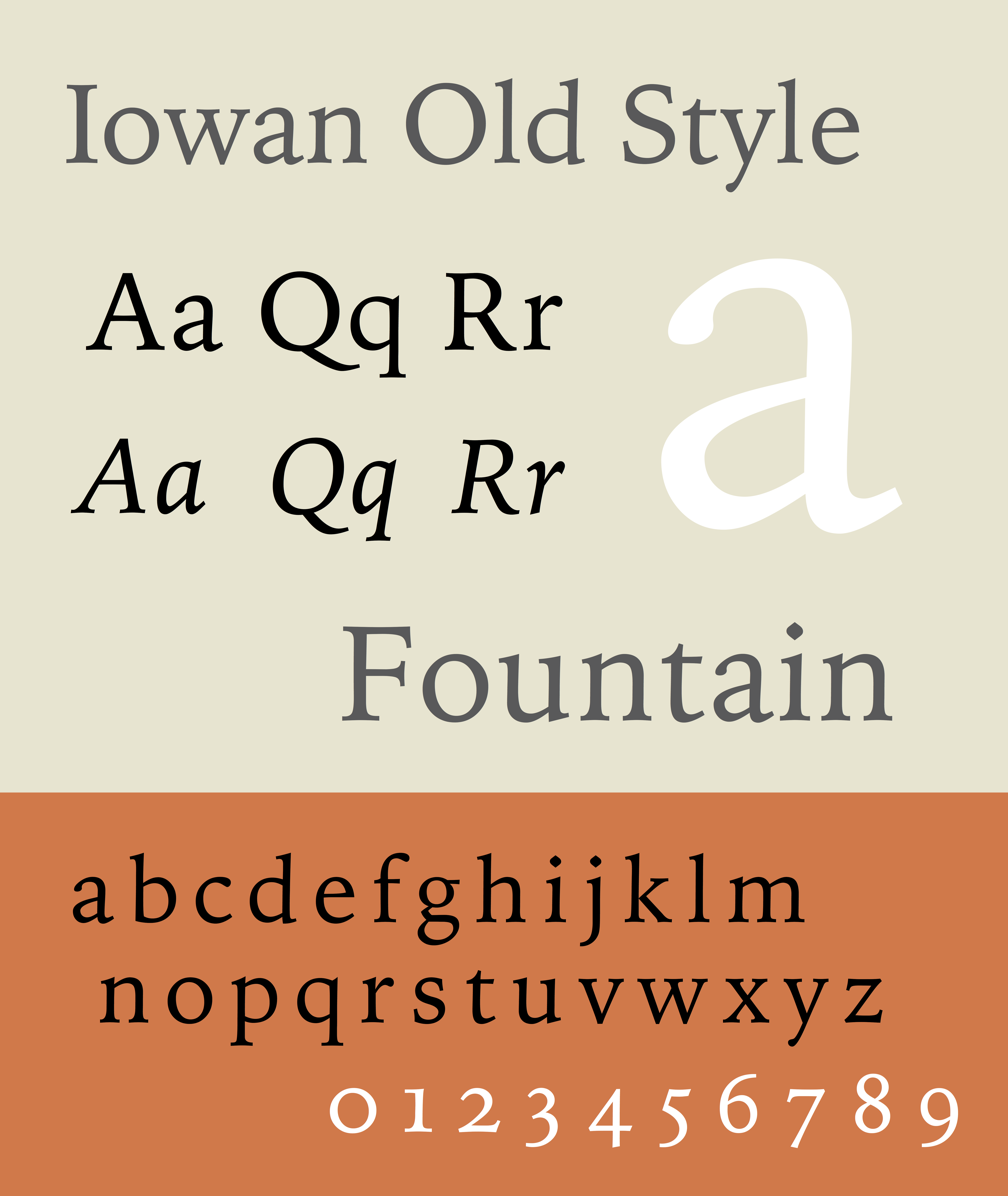
- Category: Serif
- Classification: Old-style
- Designer: John Downer
- Foundry: Bitstream
- Date released: 1991

Iowan Old Style is a serif typeface designed by John Downer and released by Bitstream in 1991.

Iowan Old Style is inspired by serif typefaces from Renaissance Italy, now called the "old-style" or Venetian model of typeface design, with influence from Downer's work as hand-painter of signs.

Compared to the historical models it is based on, Iowan has a higher x-height, meaning that the lowercase letters are taller and appear larger and wider, producing a design that is suitable for display and on-screen use. It is used as a default font on the Apple Books application and is included as a system font on iOS and macOS.

== Design ==
Downer has described the design "more Venetian than Aldine" and influenced by lettering. It has diamond-dots (tittles) on the "i" and "j" similar to the Arts and Crafts-influenced Goudy Old Style.

Iowan began as a design for ITC, but after the company dropped plans to release it, the font was bought up by Matthew Carter of Bitstream, who digitized and released it. Bitstream later revisited the design, adding ornaments and titling capitals. The character set includes small capitals and ligatures, as well as Cyrillic characters. Stephen Coles, an expert on digital fonts, describes its design as "hardworking."

== Gallery ==
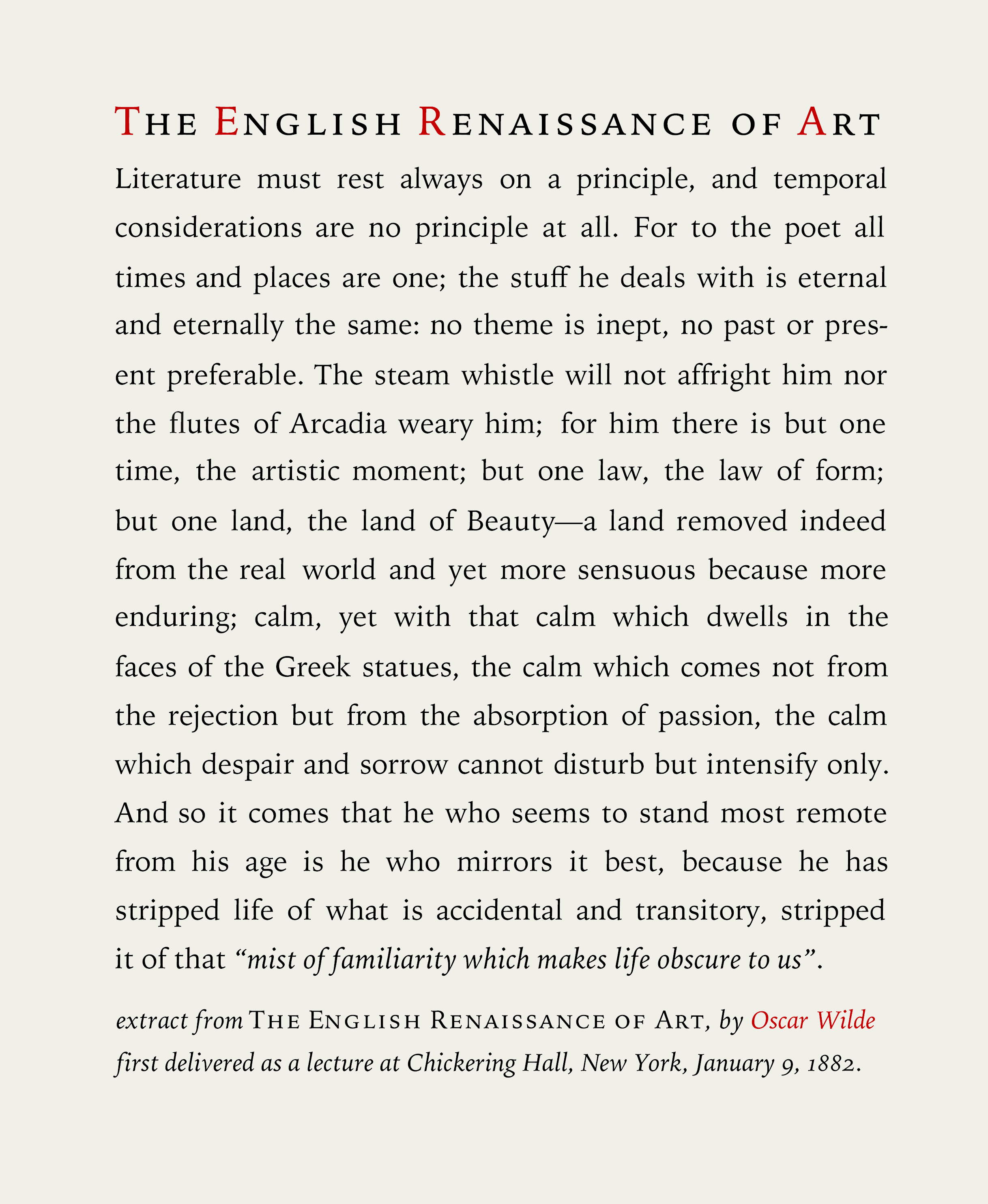
An extended setting of a text by Oscar Wilde in Iowan Old Style, showing justified text and leading between the lines.
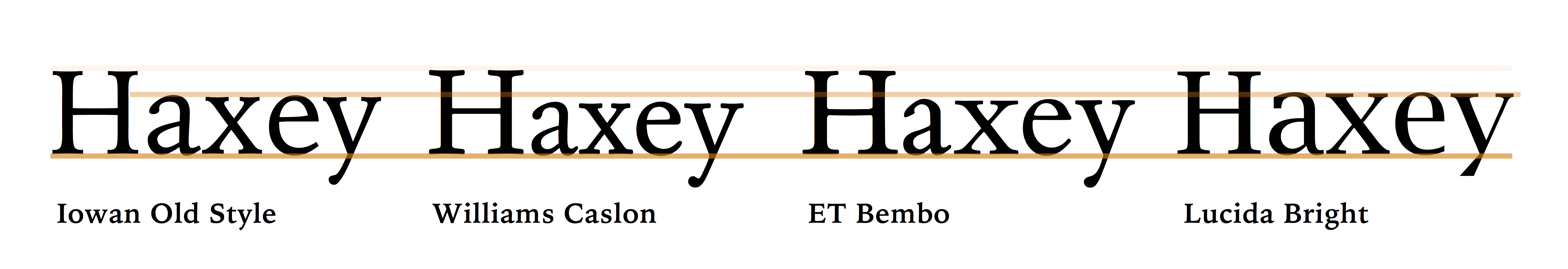
Iowan Old Style's x-height compared to other serif fonts: higher than Caslon and Bembo, used in fine book printing, but lower than Lucida Bright, which is intended for maximum legibility.
