= Dead History =

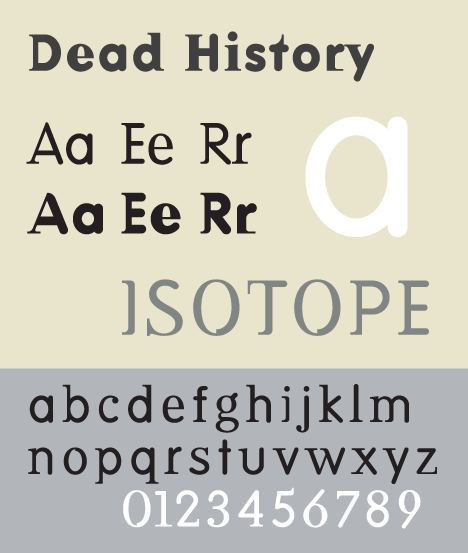
- Category: Sans-serif–serif hybrid
- Classification: Geometric sans-serif Didone; Postmodern
- Designer(s): P. Scott Makela
- Foundry: Emigre
- Date released: 1990

Dead History is a typeface which explores combining structural elements of both geometric sans-serif and Didone serif typefaces.

== History ==
The Dead history typeface was designed in 1990 by P. Scott Makela and is licensed by Emigre. While Makela studied in the design program at Cranbook, he used a digital process to create Dead History as opposed to Phototypesetting. With his computer, he combined elements of both the VAG Rounded and Bell Centennial to create Dead History. The typeface went through a few more edits before being licensed by Emigre in 1994, where it was redrawn and finalized by Zuzana Licko. In 2011, The Museum of Modern Art in New York added Dead History to its architecture and design collection. The typeface was designed when digital tools became standard for designers. Dead history aided in paving the way for other dual typefaces and more creative approaches to the design of type.

== Characteristics ==
Dead History's strokes transition from unbracketed serifs and contrasting stroke width on the left side of characters to a mono-weighted sans-serif with soft, rounded terminals on the right. This typeface is most often associated with postmodern ideals from the time by shifting from the idea of clear and simple to expressive and intense forms. This allows readers to explore type not just as a way of communication but also as a visual experience.
