= Taigi Unicode =

- Category: Serif
- Designer(s): Lâu Kiat-ga̍k

Taigi Unicode is a TrueType font specifically designed to include the character combinations necessary to display Pe̍h-ōe-jī, a romanization for Taiwanese Hokkien.
