= John Downer (sign painter) =

American sign painter, typeface and logo designer (born 1951)

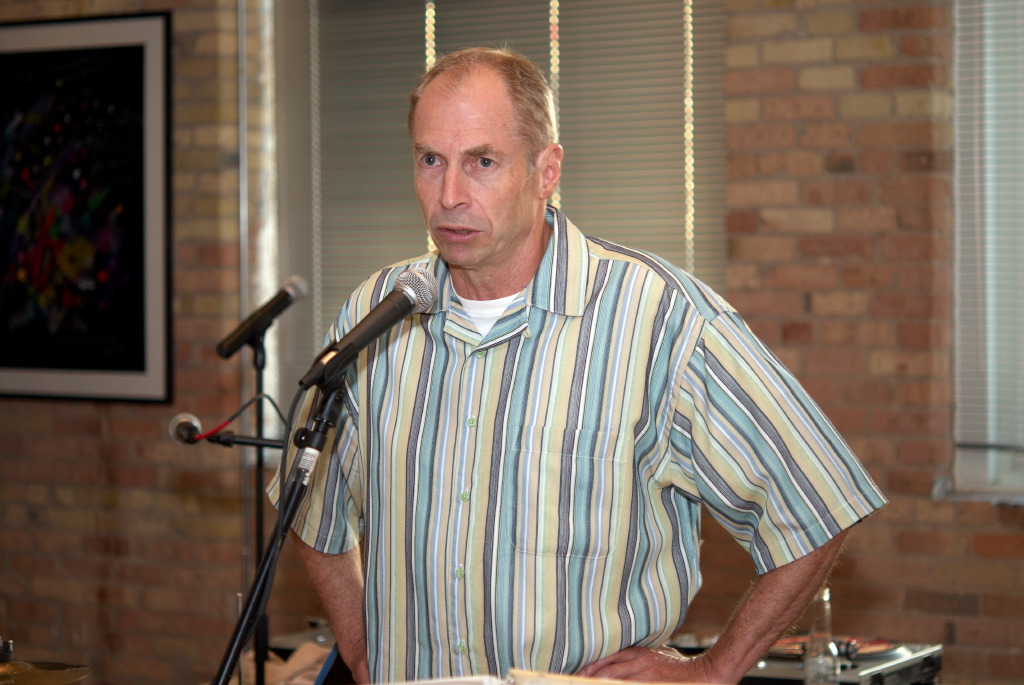
- Downer in 2012
- Born: January 30, 1951 (age 75); Tacoma, Washington, U.S.
- Occupations: Typeface Designer, Logo Designer, Sign Painter
- Years active: 1969-present

John Downer (born 1951) is an American sign painter, typeface and logo designer. Downer began his career as a painter of signs. Among his best-known digital fonts are Iowan Old Style, Roxy, Triplex Italic, and Brothers.

Downer studied at Washington State University and the University of Iowa. His work was featured amongst that of others in the 2014 documentary Sign Painters. He has lectured on type and sign design at conferences and at The Cooper Union.

== Typeface designs ==
- Iowan Old Style - Venetian old-style serif
- Roxy (Font Bureau) - stroke-modulated sans-serif
- Triplex Italic (Emigre)
- Brothers (Emigre) - chamfered display wedge-serif influenced by nineteenth-century lettering
- Paperback (House Industries) - text serif face with optical sizes
- SamSans - humanist sans-serif
- Vendetta (Emigre) - inspired by old-style Venetian serif fonts but with sharpened serifs
- Council (Emigre) - condensed display wedge-serif, capitals-only
- Ironmonger (Font Bureau) - angular all-caps display alphabet inspired by lettering on buildings
- Simona (Design Lab) - serif, similar to the work of Fournier and Bodoni

== Proprietary typefaces ==
- Gonnick [for cartoonist Larry Gonnick]
- Screenmax (bitmap serif typefaces at 7 pixel x-height in Roman, Italic, Bold and Black)
