= P. Scott Makela =

American graphic designer

Paul Scott Makela (February 6, 1960, Saint Paul, Minnesota – May 7, 1999, Pontiac, Michigan) was a graphic designer, multimedia designer and type designer. Among other work, he was especially noted for the design of Dead History, a postmodern typeface (issued by the Emigre digital type foundry) that combined features of a rounded sans serif typeface and a crisp neo-classical serif typeface. With the emergence of the personal computer in the mid-1980s, Makela was among the first to explore digital programs such as Photoshop and Adobe Illustrator. As a result, he created an idiosyncratic, original and highly controversial design aesthetic. In particular, his disregard for clean, modernist, problem-solving design agendas—synonymous with contemporary corporate graphic design—caused much debate among powerful, old-guard designers such as Massimo Vignelli, Paul Rand, and Henry Wolf.

== Early life and education ==
Makela was born in Saint Paul, Minnesota. He graduated from Minneapolis College of Art and Design in 1985.

== Career ==
He developed a notable body of work of graphics, film and "industrial soul" music before his sudden death at the age of 39 in May 1999. Commercial yet highly personal, Makela created visually aggressive work for clients such as Apple Computer, Rossignol, Nike and Sony. Projects such as Michael Jackson's "Scream" and film titles for the seminal Fight Club defined a post-modern moment in graphic design, along with the work of contemporaries such as April Greiman and David Carson.

In 1996, Makela and partner and wife, Laurie Haycock Makela became designers-in-residence and co-directors of the graduate program in Graphic Design at Cranbrook Academy of Art in Michigan, where they also ran their studio, Words + Pictures for Business + Culture. Together with writer Lewis Blackwell they authored Whereishere (Ginko Press) an "unprecedented print-website concept that broke from the orthodox approach to understanding two dimensional design." As a passionate snowboarder and mountain biker, Makela epitomized and expressed early 1990s American youth culture.

== Death and legacy ==
Makela died of epiglottitis in 1999. Makela's obituary was penned by design critic Steven Heller for the New York Times. Makela's graphic design was featured in design magazines around the world including Eye magazine (No. 12, Vol. 3, 1994). Makela and Haycock-Makela were the co-recipients of an AIGA Medal in 2000.

In 2013, Haycock Makela presented "Dead History: an era, a typeface and a love story" about her late husband and their work together at Minneapolis College of Art and Design and Cranbrook Academy of Art.
