= Emigre Fonts =

American type foundry

Emigre, Inc.
- Trade name: Emigre Fonts
- Type: Private
- Industry: Typography
- Founded: 1984; 42 years ago
- Founder: Rudy VanderLans; Zuzana Licko
- Headquarters: Berkeley, California, United States
- Products: See § Typefaces

Emigre, Inc., doing business as Emigre Fonts, is a digital type foundry based in Berkeley, California, that was founded in 1985 by husband-and-wife team Rudy VanderLans and Zuzana Licko. The type foundry grew out of Emigre magazine, a publication founded by VanderLans and two Dutch friends who met in San Francisco, CA in 1984. Note that unlike the word émigré, Emigre is officially spelled without accents.

== History ==
Emigre Fonts was founded as an independent foundry in 1985 quickly following the release of the first issue of Emigre magazine in 1984.

In a 2002 interview with Rhonda Rubinstein for Eye Magazine, Licko recalled the early days of her type design and the important relationship between the magazine and the foundry:

“When I started building Macintosh bitmap fonts in 1984, it was a purely experimental endeavour. I didn’t have a client for these fonts, nor did I plan to start a type foundry. It was Emigre magazine that opened up these options. Rudy had started it (with two Dutch artists) as a showcase for émigré artists. Issue #3 was the turning point for my typeface experiments and for the magazine, as it was typeset entirely using my first Lo-Res fonts. We had a lot of inquiries about the availability of these typefaces that no one had seen before. It was the start of Emigre Fonts."

Coinciding with the advent of the Macintosh computer, Emigre took advantage of the new medium to design digital typefaces without requiring the equipment or manufacturing infrastructure of a traditional type foundry. Rather than adhering to the aesthetics of metal type optimized for letterpress printing, Licko began designing fonts that embraced the limitations of bitmap graphics endemic to early PCs and the idiosyncrasies of dot matrix printing. Robin Kinross analyzed these fonts in a 1992 article for Eye Magazine: "The early productions were rationalised by reference to the requirements of low-memory computing and low-resolution screen display and printer output, and show considerate ingenuity in juggling with a heavily reduced formal repertoire, to make coherent sets of characters." Continuing to embrace advances in technology, Licko later produced vector-based design.

In addition to being one of the first companies to design original fonts made on and for a computer, Emigre Fonts was the first to sell licenses and transfer digital fonts online. Created by long-time Emigre collaborator, Tim Starback, the original system – called "Now Serving" – was built using FirstClass. Downloads could take up to one hour, requiring four to six modems (phone lines) to handle the demand. In time, a 56K "digital" connection to the Internet was added, which allowed customers all over the world to connect without long distance rates. Starback recalls those early days:

"Eventually we figured out how to get the web server to talk to our database and then authorize a credit card, still done with a dial-up modem. At that point, we had an automated system that could process orders and give the customer access to the font automatically. All the tech stuff was new to everyone, so we were all learning together."

In the process, Emigre created the "perfect model of an autonomous foundry run by designers. Many designers followed Emigre's lead, joining their library or launching their own foundries."

Emigre Fonts developed or released some of the most cutting-edge typefaces of the late 1980s and 1990s. Their success as pioneers in the digital type industry is in no small part credited to their eager adoption of new technologies and ability to recognize skill in contemporary designers, as expressed in a 2016 interview of Licko by Sally Kerrigan for Adobe Typekit:

“Each of our font families exudes a certain quality that is either tied to the technology of the time, the level of craftsmanship of the designer, or the prevailing aesthetic preferences of the time. Because the Emigre library developed over the past 30 years, alongside and in reaction to evolving technologies, each typeface is like a snapshot in time.”

During this early digital period when design professionals were combining analog and digital production methods, Emigre’s print magazine (known for featuring graphic design criticism and experimental layouts) doubled as an advertising venue for Emigre’s typefaces by showcasing their fonts in use off-screen. Though many of Emigre's fonts are considered icons of Postmodern design, Emigre didn’t limit themselves. Licko’s popular revivals, Mrs Eaves (based on Baskerville) and Filosofia (based on Bodoni), were a departure from this style.

In an interview in Emigre No. 15, in response to a question about the legibility of her experimental bitmap fonts, Licko stated that "You read best what you read most," indicating that fonts such as Helvetica and Times Roman are not intrinsically legible but become so through repeated use. This was a highly contested opinion within the world of type design that generated heated discussion in the pages of Emigre magazine and elsewhere. This was later referred to as the “Legibility wars” – a term coined in 2004 by Robin Kinross in his book Modern Typography: an Essay in Critical History.

Emigre was often criticized for rejecting Modernist design rules. Massimo Vignelli, a prominent designer and voice in the graphic design field, was highly critical of the foundry. Vignelli famously called Emigre a “typographic garbage factory,” insinuating that they were either a threat to the dominant graphic design ideals or insignificant as an “aberration of culture” in a typography panel discussion reported on in a 1991 issue of Print Magazine. This sparked an intense debate in the industry for much of the 1990s. To Vignelli's later collaboration with Emigre to directly promote the release of Licko’s Filosofia typeface by designing the poster to announce the release, Licko responded: “Massimo’s willingness to collaborate on our announcement reflects Emigre’s ability to bridge different approaches.”

In 2011, The Museum of Modern Art in New York acquired five Emigre typeface families. The digital fonts are Keedy Sans by Mr. Keedy, Mason Serif by Jonathan Barnbrook, Template Gothic by Barry Deck, Oakland (a.k.a Lo-Res) by Zuzana Licko, and Dead History by P. Scott Makela. They were added to the Architecture and design Collection as part of a selection of 23 digital typefaces documenting milestone designs covering the twentieth century. The acquisition followed in the footsteps of the Museum's first ever typeface acquisition, a case of 36-point Helvetica Bold lead type designed by Max Miedinger and Eduard Hoffman in 1957 for the Haas type foundry in Münchenstein, Switzerland. The typefaces were on display as part of the exhibit “Standard Deviations: Types and Families in Contemporary Design.”

Emigre remained faithful to their belief that legibility is a byproduct of exposure or practice. “People read best what they read most,” was a manifesto that encouraged VanderLans and Licko to continue exploring new designs. The idea that new typefaces or layouts could become not just more legible but better for their intended uses and technologies than old ones gave birth to a full library of new designs for a new digital era. Refusing to waver in the wake of criticism, Licko and VanderLans forged their own path, revolutionizing design aesthetics and becoming one of the most influential digital type foundries.

== Books ==
- Emigre: Graphic Design into the Digital Realm, 1993 – Book celebrating Emigre’s first 10 years
- Emigre (Exhibition Catalog), 1998 – Catalog to commemorate an exhibition about the work of Emigre at the Jan van Eyck Academy in the Netherlands
- Emigre Fonts Type Specimens Volume I, 2006 – Limited edition, case bound book containing 12 original Emigre Fonts type specimens
- Emigre No.70: The Look Back Issue, 2009 – A 512-page selection of reprints that traces Emigre's development from its early bitmap design days in the mid 1980s through to the experimental layouts that defined the so-called
- Departures: Five Milestone Font Families by Emigre, 2011 – This book celebrates the acquisition of five Emigre typeface families by The Museum of Modern Art in New York
- Emigre Fonts: Type Specimens 1986-2016, 2016 – 752-page compilation featuring reprints of Emigre's most remarkable specimen designs covering a period of 30 years

== Typefaces ==
Most typefaces in the Emigre Fonts library were designed and produced by Zuzana Licko. Over the years Emigre also licensed fonts from an international group of designers. All Emigre fonts are for retail and sold by licensing agreement to users worldwide.

In addition to licensing fonts directly to users through the Emigre Fonts website, in 2016 Emigre licensed the entire Emigre Fonts library to Adobe Fonts to make its fonts available through Adobe’s Creative Cloud service. The annual subscription to Creative Cloud includes single user desktop licenses and Web font hosting services for all Emigre Fonts.

The company's type library features fonts by Mark Andresen, Bob Aufuldish, Jonathan Barnbrook, Rodrigo Cavazos, Barry Deck, Eric Donelan, John Downer, Elliott Peter Earls, Edward Fella, Sibylle Hagmann, Frank Heine, John Hersey, Jeffery Keedy, Zuzana Licko, P. Scott Makela, Conor Mangat, Nancy Mazzei, Brian Kelly, Miles Newlyn, Claudio Piccinini, Just van Rossum, Christian Schwartz and Rudy VanderLans. See full font library and specimens type specimens available on Emigre's website.

- Alda by Berton Hasebe (2008)
- Arbitrary by Barry Deck (1990)
- Backspacer by Nancy Mazzei and Brian Kelly (1993)
- Base 9 & 12 by Zuzana Licko (1995)
- Base 900 by Zuzana Licko (2010)
- Base Monospace by Zuzana Licko (1997)
- Big Cheese by Bob Aufuldish and Eric Donelan (1992)
- Blockhead Alphabet by John Hersey (1995)
- Blockhead Illustrations by John Hersey (1995)
- Brothers by John Downer (1999)
- Cardea by David Cabianca (2004)
- Cholla Slab by Sibyl Hagmann (1999)
- Chowdown by Tucker Nichols (2019)
- Citizen by Zuzana Licko (1986)
- Council by John Downer (1999)
- Crackly by Zuzana Licko (2019) Dalliance by Frank Heine (2002)
- Dead History by P. Scott Makela (1990)
- Democratica by Miles Newlyn (1991)
- Dogma by Zuzana Licko (1994)
- Eidetic Neo by Rodrigo Cavazos (2000)
- Elektrix by Zuzana Licko (1989)
- Exocet by Jonathan Barnbrook (1991)
- Fairplex by Zuzana Licko (2002)
- FellaParts by Edward Fella (1993)
- Filosofia (Bodoni revival) by Zuzana Licko (1996)
- Filosofia Parma by Zuzana Licko (2019)
- Hypnopaedia by Zuzana Licko (1997)
- Journal by Zuzana Licko (1990)
- Keedy by Jeffery Keedy (1989)
- Lo-Res by Zuzana Licko (1985 and 2001)
- Los Feliz by Christian Schwartz (2001)
- Lunatix by Zuzana Licko (1988)
- Malaga by Xavier Dupré (2007)
- Mason by Jonathan Barnbrook (1992)
- Matrix (typeface) by Zuzana Licko (1986)
- Missionary by Miles Newlyn (1991)
- Modula by Zuzana Licko (1985)
- Modula Round & Ribbed by Zuzana Licko (1995)
- Motion by Frank Heine (1992)
- Mr Eaves Sans & Modern by Zuzana Licko (2009)
- Mr Eaves XL Sans, Modern & Narrow by Zuzana Licko (2009)
- Mrs Eaves (Baskerville revival) by Zuzana Licko (1996)
- Mrs Eaves XL Serif & Narrow by Zuzana Licko (2009)
- Narly by Zuzana Licko (1993)
- NotCaslon by Mark Andresen (1991)
- Oblong by Rudy VanderLans and Zuzana Licko (1988)
- Ottomat by Claudio Piccinini (1995)
- OutWest by Edward Fella (1993)
- Platelet by Conor Mangat (1993)
- Poppi by Martin Friedl (2003)
- Priori by Jonathan Barnbrook (2003)
- Priori Acute by Jonathan Barnbrook (2009)
- Program by Zuzana Licko (2013)
- Puzzler by Zuzana Licko (2005)
- Remedy by Frank Heine (1991)
- Sabbath Black by Miles Newlyn (1992)
- Senator by Zuzana Licko (1988)
- Soda Script by Zuzana Licko (1995)
- Solex by Zuzana Licko (2000)
- Suburban by Rudy VanderLans (1993)
- Tangly by Zuzana Licko (2018)
- Tarzana by Zuzana Licko (1998)
- Template Gothic by Barry Deck (1990)
- The Apollo Program Font Set by Elliott Peter Earls (1993-98*)
- Thingbat by John Hersey (1993)
- Totally Gothic & Totally Glyphic by Zuzana Licko (1990)
- Tribute by Frank Heine (2003)
- Triplex by Zuzana Licko (1989)
- Triplex Italic by John Downer (1985)
- Variex by Rudy VanderLans and Zuzana Licko (1988)
- Vendetta by John Downer (1999)
- Vista Sans by Xavier Dupré (2004)
- Vista Sans Narrow by Xavier Dupré (2008)
- Vista Slab by Xavier Dupré (2008)
- Whirligig by Zuzana Licko (1994)
- ZeitGuys by Bob Aufuldish and Eric Donelan (1994)

== Awards ==
- MacUser Desktop Publisher of the Year Award, 1986
- Chrysler Award for Innovation in Design, 1994
- Publish Magazine Impact Awards, 1996
- American Institute of Graphic Arts Gold Medal Award, 1997
- Charles Nypels Award for Excellence in Typography, 1998
- Honorary members of the Society of Typographic Arts, Chicago, 2010
- Society of Typographic Aficionados Annual Typography Award, 2013
- 29th New York Type Directors Club Medal, 2016

== Museum exhibits ==
Solo exhibitions

- "Emigre Magazine: Selections from the Permanent Collection," Museum of Modern Art, San Francisco, 1997
- "Charles Nypels Prize," Jan van Eyck Academy, Maastricht, Netherlands, 1998
- "Emigre in Istanbul," Contemporary Art Center, Istanbul, Turkey, 1999
- "Emigre in Norfolk," Old Dominion University Gallery, Norfolk, Virginia, 2005
- "Emigre at Gallery 16," Gallery 16, San Francisco, 2010
- "Emigre magazine: design, discourse and authorship," University of Reading, UK, 2017

General exhibitions

- "Pacific Wave: California Graphic Design," Museo Fortuny, Venice, Italy, 1987
- "Graphic Design in America," Walker Art Center, Minneapolis, 1989
- "Mixing Messages: Graphic Design in Contemporary Culture," Cooper Hewitt, Smithsonian Design Museum, 1996
- "Designer as Author, Voices and Visions," Northern Kentucky University, 1996
- "Design Culture Now: National Design Triennial," Cooper Hewitt, Smithsonian Design Museum, 2000
- "East Coast/West Coast" at Centre du Graphisme, Échirolles, France, 2002
- "D-Day:le design aujourd'hui," at Centre Pompidou, Paris, 2005
- "Digitally Mastered," MoMA, New York, 2007
- "Quick, Quick, Slow," Experimentadesign Lisboa 2009, Berardo Collection Museum, Lisbon, Portugal, 2009 (featured Emigre magazine issues10–24)
- "Typographic Tables," Museum of Modern and Contemporary Art, Bolzano, Italy, 2011
- "Deep Surface: Contemporary Ornament and Pattern," Contemporary Art Museum, Raleigh, 2011
- "Graphic Design: Now in Production," Walker Art Center, Minneapolis, 2011 (featured "Emigre No. 70: The Look Back Issue" and Base 900)
- Postmodernism: Style and Subversion 1970–1990, Victoria & Albert Museum, London, 2011
- "Standard Deviations," MoMA, New York, 2011 (featured 23 digital typefaces for their permanent collection, including five Emigre font families: Jeffery Keedy's Keedy Sans, Jonathan Barnbrook's Mason Serif, Barry Deck's Template Gothic, Zuzana Licko's Oakland—renamed Lo-Res in 2001—and P. Scott Makela's Dead History)
- "Work from California," 25th International Biennial of Graphic Design, Brno, Czech Republic, 2012
- "Revolution/Evolution," College for Creative Studies, Detroit, 2014
- "Typeface to Interface," Museum of Modern Art, San Francisco, 2016
- "California Graphic Design, 1975–95," Los Angeles County Museum of Art, Los Angeles, 2018
- "Between the Lines: Typography in LACMA’s Collection," Los Angeles County Museum of Art, Los Angeles, 2019

Permanent collections

- Denver Art Museum holds a complete set of Emigre magazine in their permanent collection.
- Design Museum in London holds a complete set of Emigre magazine in their permanent collection.
- Letterform Archive holds the Emigre Archives in their permanent collection.
- Museum für Gestaltung (Museum of Design, Zürich) holds Emigre magazine issues in their permanent collection.
- Museum of Modern Art in New York holds a complete set of Emigre magazine, and five digital fonts from the Emigre Fonts library in their permanent collection.
- Museum of Modern Art in San Francisco holds a complete set of Emigre magazine in their permanent collection.

== Additional print resources ==
- Bouvet, Michel, East Coast West Coast: Graphistes aux États-unis, Paris, France, Les Éditions Textuel, 2002. Essay on history of Emigre.
- Dawson, Peter, The Field Guide to Typography: Typefaces in the Urban Landscape, New York, NY, Prestel, 2013. Interview with Rudy VanderLans & Zuzana Licko.
- Eskilson, Stephen J., Graphic Design: A New History, London, UK, Laurence King Publishing, 2007. Essay on Emigre in chapter on “Postmodern Typography.”
- Heller, Stephen, ed., Design Literacy: Understanding Graphic Design. New York, NY, Allworth Press with School of Visual Arts, 2014. Essay on Emigre in chapter on "Mass Media.”
- Lupton, Ellen, Mixing Messages: Graphic Design in Contemporary Culture, New York, NY, Princeton Architectural Press, 1996. Short profile of Emigre and Zuzana Licko’s typefaces. Book published in conjunction with exhibit at Cooper-Hewitt National Design Museum.
- McCarthy, Steven, The Designer as Author, Producer, Activist, Entrepreneur, Curator & Collaborator: New Models for Communicating, Amsterdam, Netherlands, BIS, 2013. Emigre referenced throughout, and short profile of Emigre in chapter on “Typographic Design Authorship.”
- Meggs, Philip B., ed., A History of Graphic Design, New York, NY, John Wiley & Sons, 1998. Profile of Emigre in chapter on “Pioneers of Digital Graphic Design.”
- Poynor, Rick, Design Without Boundaries: Visual Communication in Transition, London, UK, Booth-Clibborn Editions, 1998. Emigre referenced in essay “Cult of the Ugly,” and one essay, “Into the Digital Realm,” on Emigre.
- Poynor, Rick, No More Rules: Graphic Design and Postmodernism, New Haven, CT, Yale University Press, 2003. Emigre referenced throughout.
- Shaughnessy, Adrian, How to be a Graphic Designer, Without Losing Your Soul, London, UK, Laurence King Publishing, 2005. Interview with Rudy VanderLans.
