= Rudy VanderLans =

Dutch graphic designer (born 1955)

- Born: Ruud van der Lans; 1955; Voorburg, The Netherlands
- Education: Royal Academy of Art
- Known for: Graphic design
- Notable work: Emigre
- Movement: Postmodernism

Rudy VanderLans (born 1955) is a Dutch graphic designer, photographer, and the co-founder of Emigre Fonts, an independent type foundry in Berkeley, with his wife Zuzana Licko. He was also the art director and editor of Emigre, an influential magazine devoted to visual communications from 1984 to 2005.

Since arriving in California in 1981, VanderLans has been photographing his adoptive Golden State as an ongoing side project. He has authored a total of 11 photo books on the topic, and staged two solo exhibits at Gallery 16 in San Francisco.

== Education and early career ==
VanderLans studied graphic design at the Royal Academy of Art in the Hague (KABK) and graduated in 1979. He worked as an apprentice designer at Wim Crouwel's Total Design in Amsterdam and as a junior designer at Form Vijf and Tel Design in The Hague.

In 1981, he moved to California and studied photography at the University of California, Berkeley where he met Zuzana Licko.

VanderLans was first introduced to type design while at KABK, where the well-known Dutch type designer and teacher Gerrit Noordzij had started an ambitious and influential type and lettering program in 1970. When asked in 2001 for a contribution to a Noordzij tribute, VanderLans wrote: “Noordzij is a very distant memory for me. Although any wisdom regarding type that I carry with me must have come from him.

From 1983–85, he worked as a graphic designer and illustrator in the art department at the San Francisco Chronicle newspaper.

== Emigre ==
From 1984 until 2005 VanderLans published, edited, and designed Emigre magazine, a quarterly publication devoted to visual communication and known for its inclusion of design discourse. Andrew Blauvelt, whose writing often occurred in the magazine, wrote that "Emigre covered emerging graphic designers and typographers seldom profiled in typical industry publications. It also published spirited design criticism in its pages–finding itself to be both the message and the messenger of many debates.”

Licko and VanderLans were early adopters of the personal computer, and Emigre's launch coincided with the release of the Macintosh computer. They used the new technology to create some of the first digital layouts and typeface designs. Their experimental design aesthetics earned them equal amounts of praise and criticism in the 1990s.

Exposure of Zuzana Licko's fonts through the magazine led to VanderLans and Licko founding Emigre Fonts in 1985. VanderLans’ main contribution to Emigre Fonts continue to be his type specimen designs. In a review of the book Emigre Fonts: Type Specimens 1986-2016, critic Kenneth FitzGerald remarked that “Emigre’s specimens are notable for the negotiation of practical considerations and creative idealism—the essence of all graphic design. They demonstrate an adept dovetailing of these concerns, crafting a format that stimulates desire then provides an efficient vehicle for satisfying it. A balance is struck between providing an enthusing context for the type while not overwhelming it. Though far from 'neutral,' the framework is evocative and clear.”

VanderLans has received honorary Doctor of Arts degrees from Rhode Island School of Design (2004) and California Institute of the Arts in Valencia, California (2005).

== Books ==
- Emigre (The Book): Graphic Design into the Digital Realm, New York, NY: Van Nostrand Reinhold; John Wiley & Sons, 1993
- Emigre: Rosbeek 43, Charles Nypels Award, 1998, Netherlands: Drukkerij Rosbeek, 1998
- Emigre No.70, Selections from Emigre Magazine #1 – #69, Berkeley, CA: Gingko Press, 2009
- Departures: Five Milestone Font Families by Emigre, Berkeley, CA: Emigre, 2011
- Emigre Fonts: Type Specimens 1986 - 2016, Berkeley, CA: Gingko Press, 2016

== Photography ==
As a parallel interest to his design ventures, VanderLans has been photographing the California environment since he moved there from the Netherlands in 1981. He has authored a total of eleven photo books on the topic, and staged two solo exhibits at Gallery 16 in San Francisco.

Photography books

- Positively Palmtree, small artist book created as an artist in residence at the Visual Studies Workshop in Rochester NY, 1985.
- Picture the Southwest, small artist book, part of Emigre No. 7, 1987.
- Palm Desert, Berkeley, CA: Emigre, 1999
- Cucamonga, Berkeley, CA: Emigre, 2000
- Joshua Tree, Berkeley, CA: Emigre, 2001
- Supermarket, Berkeley, CA: Gingko Press, 2001
- Pages from an Imaginary Book, Paris, France, Onestar Press, 2003
- Bagdad, Californie, Berkeley, Rodez, France, Éditions du Rouergue, 2004
- Still Lifes, California, 2015
- Still Lifes, U.S.A., Berkeley, CA: Gingko Press, 2017
- Still Lifes, Tokyo, Berkeley, CA: Gingko Press, 2018
- Anywhere, California, Berkeley, CA: Gingko Press, 2020
- Oleander Sunset, Berkeley, CA: Gingko Press, 2021

== Awards ==
- MacUser Desktop Publisher of the Year Award, 1986
- Chrysler Award for Innovation in Design, 1994
- Publish Magazine Impact Awards, 1996
- American Institute of Graphic Arts Gold Medal Award, 1997
- Charles Nypels Award for Excellence in Typography, 1998
- Honorary members of the Society of Typographic Arts, Chicago, 2010
- Society of Typographic Aficionados Annual Typography Award, 2013
- 29th New York Type Directors Club Medal, 2016

== Permanent collections ==
- Denver Art Museum holds a complete set of Emigre magazine in their permanent collection.
- Design Museum in London holds a complete set of Emigre magazine in their permanent collection.
- Letterform Archive holds the Emigre Archives in their permanent collection.
- Museum für Gestaltung (Museum of Design, Zurich) holds Emigre magazine issues in their permanent collection.
- Museum of Modern Art in New York holds a complete set of Emigre magazine, and five digital fonts from the Emigre Fonts library in their permanent collection.
- Museum of Modern Art in San Francisco holds a complete set of Emigre magazine in their permanent collection.

== See also ==
- List of AIGA medalists
- First Things First 2000 manifesto
