= Jonathan Barnbrook =

English graphic designer (born 1966)

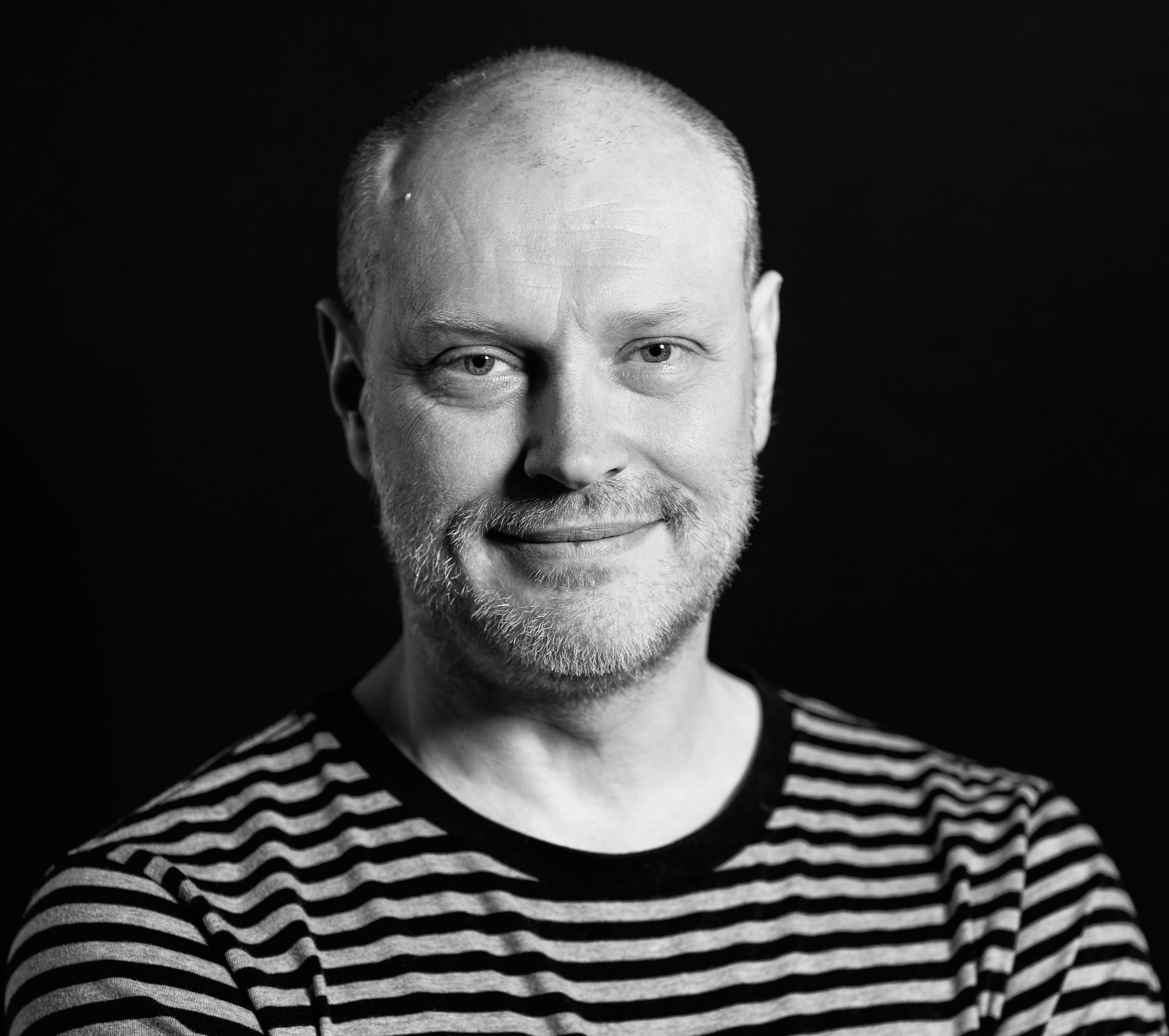
- Jonathan Barnbrook, November 2016
- Born: 1966 (age 59–60); Luton, England
- Occupations: Graphic designer and typographer

Jonathan Barnbrook (born 1966) is a British graphic designer, film maker, type designer, and typographer. He trained at Saint Martin's School of Art and at the Royal College of Art, both in London.

== Work ==
Barnbrook designed the cover artwork of David Bowie's 2002 album Heathen, where he used his 'Priori' typeface for the first type. He went on to design the sleeves for Reality (2003), The Next Day (2013) and Blackstar (2016), each with their own specially designed typography. He cites record cover artwork as an early design influence, and possibly the interest that drew him to graphic design, with other covers including ones for John Foxx, Tuxedomoon and Cult with No Name.

Barnbrook is also a type designer and has released typefaces including Bastard, Exocet, False Idol, Infidel, Moron, Newspeak, Olympukes, Sarcastic, Shock & Awe. Many have emotive and controversial titles reflecting the style and themes of Barnbrook's work. His typeface Mason, originally released as Manson, is available from Emigre.

From 1997 to 2003 Barnbrook collaborated with Young British Artist Damien Hirst, mainly on the design, layout and typography of his book I Want To Spend the Rest of My Life Everywhere, with Everyone, One to One, Always, Forever, Now, and on artwork associated with his restaurant Pharmacy.

Designers, stay away from corporations that want you to lie for them; on billboard, Las Vegas. (c) Jonathan Barnbrook, 1999

A recurring theme of Barnbrook's graphic design is the series of personal responses to political events, which often follow or develop detournement methods. He describes as a major influence to his work "an inner anger which is a response to all the unfairness that is in this world". He has stated his ambition to use "design as a weapon for social change".

He was a signatory to the First Things First 2000 manifesto, in which graphic designers pledged to "put their skills to worthwhile use'"and address the "unprecedented environmental, social and cultural crises" that they saw in the world. In 2001 Barnbrook made a work entitled Designers, stay away from corporations that want you to lie for them, a quote from Tibor Kalman; it took the form of a large-format advertising billboard and was first displayed in Las Vegas during a convention for members of AIGA, the American 'Professional Association for Design'.

Barnbrook has also contributed work to, and been art director of two editions of, Adbusters, a graphically designed magazine devoted to political and social causes, and run by an organisation aiming to "advance the new social activist movement of the information age".

== Work in Japan ==
Barnbrook is well-known in Japan. His studio completed the logo and corporate identity for Roppongi Hills, the largest post war development in Tokyo, and also worked on the corporate identity of Mori Arts Center and Mori Art Museum. He has also worked for Shiseido.

== Contemporary culture ==
An exhibition of Barnbrook's work, entitled Friendly Fire, ran between June and October 2007 at the Design Museum in London. The exhibition included work in response to the first and second Iraq conflicts, the First Things First Manifesto, examples of Barnbrook's typography and film work. A 320pp hardback collection of his work – 'The Barnbrook Bible' – was published in 2007.

== Bibliography ==
- Typography Now Two: Implosion by Rick Poynor (Booth-Clibborn Editions) was designed by Barnbrook and features leading graphic designers of the late 20th Century and early 21st Century including Tomato (Collective), April Greiman and Jonathan Barnbook himself.
- Barnbrook Bible by Jonathan Barnbrook – 2007 (Booth-Clibborn Editions/Rizzoli) sees Barnbrook revisiting his earlier projects and presenting his views on design and his personal graphic work. The book was released to coincided with the Friendly Fire exhibition at the Design Museum in London.
