= Jessie Stanley =

Jessie Stanley nee. Fairweatheryyy
- Born: Australia
- Education: RMIT, Melbourne (current); Monash University, Melbourne (2001)
- Known for: Graphic design, Visual art
- Awards: Type Directors Club, Certificate of Typographic Excellence (2009); AGDA, Distinction Award (2004/06)
- Website: http://www.jessiestanley.com

Jessie Stanley is a designer and artist from Melbourne, Australia. She had an internship at Fabrica in Italy after earning her Bachelor of Visual Communication degree with First Class Honors from Monash University in 2001. In 2003, she founded her own studio, "Foundry".

== Early career ==
As a graphic design graduate from Monash University (2001) and inspired by the First Things First 1964 manifesto, in 2001, Stanley travelled from Australia to Europe to intern at Fabrica in Italy and Studio Dumbar in the Netherlands. In 2003, after her return to Melbourne, Stanley established her studio called Foundry. The craftsmanship and tactility displayed in her early work like the 'Measurement' project, a series of printed measuring tools, won prestigious awards including the local Premiers Design Mark (2008) and the international Type Directors Club Certificate of Typographic Excellence (2009).

== Biography ==
Stanley has lectured in the Bachelor of Visual Communication at both Monash University (2003–2004) and Swinburne University (2004–2007) in Melbourne, Australia. Since 2014, she has worked under her own name as a visual artist, and her public installations and exhibitions have been highly influenced by her background in graphic design and her desire to "redefine the role of graphic design".

As part of exploring the conceptual abilities of graphic design, Stanley progressed from traditional print media to three-dimensional works, including a public installation called 'The Distance Between You and Me' (2015), which focused on highlighting the importance of local histories and engaging local communities. Stanley has ancestors buried in Vaughan Cemetery, where she placed the works that included over 2,000 origami flowers.

Her most recent work has begun exploring spaces through projected light and interactive elements. In 2017, 'Spectrum' featured in an RMIT-sponsored projection at Melbourne's White Night festival and used light and colour to show the opposing forces in the world. In 2018, her kinetic work, titled 'HUMAN / NATURE' (2018), which was created during her 'Artist in Residency' in the city of Moreland, narrated the history of the Kyneton Botanic Gardens.

== Awards ==
1. Besen Emerging Artist Mentorship with Melbourne Fringe Festival (2016)
2. Artist in Residence, MoreArts Festival, City of Moreland (2016)
3. Banyule Award, Works On Paper, Finalist 2015 Hidden: Rookwood Cemetery Sculpture Park Walk, Commended Artist (2016)
4. QANTM Create Design Award, Finalist: Print, Creative (2011)
5. Modern Craftsmen Commission at Pin-up Gallery, Honourable Mention (2011)
6. Type Directors Club, New York, Certificate of Typographic Excellence (2009)
7. Premiers Design Awards, Premiers Design Mark (2008)
8. Fox River Paper Outstanding Design Awards, First place (2007)
9. Australian Graphic Design Association, Distinction Award (2006)
10. Australian Graphic Design Association, Distinction Award (2004)
11. State Of Design Awards, Finalist (2004)
12. Type Directors Club, New York, Certificate of Typographic Excellence (2004)

== Solo exhibitions ==
1. The Distance Between You And Me, series of site specific installations in the Township of Vaughan, Victoria, Castlemaine State Festival (2015)
2. Everything Is From Nothing (Exploring the Big Bang), Stockroom Gallery, Kyneton (2011)
3. Today Tomorrow, State of Design Festival at Found by Foundry, Daylesford (2009)
4. Just One Person And Look At All You Have Done, Street installation, Prahran (2004)
5. Broadcast, Kraznapolsky Gallery, St Kilda (2001)

== Group exhibitions ==
1. 2015 (current) THE VIEW FROM HERE, Anita Traverso Gallery, Richmond
2. 2011 YOU ARE HERE, Stockroom Gallery, Kyneton
3. 2011 MODERN CRAFTSMEN COMMISSION, Pin-up Gallery, Collingwood
4. 2009 TYPE DIRECTORS CLUB AWARDS EXHIBITION, United States, Canada, Europe, & Japan
5. 2008 PREMIERS DESIGN AWARDS, Melbourne Museum
6. 2007 FOX RIVER PAPER OUTSTANDING DESIGN AWARDS EXHIBITION, United States & Europe
7. 2004 STATE OF DESIGN, Melbourne Museum
8. 2004 TYPE DIRECTORS CLUB AWARDS EXHIBITION, United States, Canada, Europe, & Japan

== Publications ==
1. ABC Open, Family History Inspires Art in Vaughan, (21 March 2015).
2. Ish Magazine Singapore (March 2009), designer profile.
3. The Age (July 24, 2009), designer profile, The Arts.
4. Green magazine, Issue 12, pp32–39, feature article.
5. Wallpaper* (December 2008), product editorial.
6. Page magazine, Germany. Issue 05.04, (May 2004), pp52–58 feature article.
7. The Melbourne Design Guide (2009), Alphabet Press, pp150–151, studio profile.
8. Kent Wilson, 2011, Generation, Capture, Release: Fairweather and Robbins, 27/9/11.
9. Monument magazine Issue 62 (August/September 2004), pp76–77 studio profile.
