= First Things First 2000 manifesto =

The First Things First 2000 manifesto, launched by Adbusters magazine in 1999, was an updated version of the earlier First Things First manifesto written and published in 1964 by Ken Garland, a British designer.

The 1999 manifesto was signed by a group of 33 figures from the international graphic design community, many of them well known, and simultaneously published in Adbusters (Canada), Emigre (Issue 51) and AIGA Journal of Graphic Design (United States), Eye magazine no. 33 vol. 8, Autumn 1999, Blueprint (Britain) and Items (Netherlands). The manifesto was subsequently published in many other magazines and books around the world, sometimes in translation. Its aim was to generate discussion about the graphic design profession's priorities in the design press and at design schools. Some designers welcomed this attempt to reopen the debate, while others rejected the manifesto.

The question of value-free design has been continually contested in the graphic design community between those who are concerned about the need for values in design and those who believe it should be value-free. Those who believe that design can be free from values reject the idea that graphic designers should concern themselves with underlying political questions. Those who are concerned about values believe that designers should be critical and take a stand in their choice of work, for instance by not promoting industries and products perceived to be harmful. Examples of projects that might be classified as unacceptable include many forms of advertising and designs for cigarette manufacturers, arms companies and so on. Adbusters has been a significant outlet for these ideas, especially in its commitment to detournement and culture jamming.

== Signatories ==
Thirty-three people signed the manifesto:

- Jonathan Barnbrook
- Nick Bell
- Andrew Blauvelt
- Hans Bockting
- Irma Boom
- Sheila Levrant de Bretteville
- Max Bruinsma
- Domenico Catapano
- Siân Cook
- Linda van Deursen
- Chris Dixon
- William Drenttel
- Gert Dumbar
- Simon Esterson
- Vince Frost
- Ken Garland
- Milton Glaser
- Jessica Helfand
- Steven Heller
- Andrew Howard
- Tibor Kalman
- Jeffery Keedy
- Zuzana Licko
- Ellen Lupton
- Katherine McCoy
- Armand Mevis
- J. Abbott Miller
- Rick Poynor
- Lucienne Roberts
- Erik Spiekermann
- Jan van Toorn
- Teal Triggs
- Rudy VanderLans
- Bob Wilkinson
