= Ezri =

Ezri is a derivation of the Hebrew verb "ozer". "Ozer" translates into English as "to help". Ezri is translated from the Hebrew as "my help".

Ezri is used both as a surname and a given name. The earliest of use of Ezri as a given name is found in the Old Testament at 1 Chronicles 27:26, where Ezri is identified as the son of Chelub. "Chelub", though, is a slight mispronounciation in the King James Bible, since the original Hebrew text in the Torah uses a "cuff", not a "chuff" character. A better rendering of the "Chelub" as "Kelub" is found in other translations. Ezri's occupation is described as an overseer of the workers of King David's lands.

Notable instances of the name Ezri include:

- Ezri Dax, fictional character from Star Trek: Deep Space Nine
- Ezri Konsa (born 1997), English professional footballer
- Ezri Namvar (born c. 1952), Iranian-born American businessman, philanthropist and convicted criminal
- Ezri Tarazi (born 1962), Israeli industrial designer and educator for design

== See also ==
- Esri
- Avi Ezri (disambiguation)
