= Eye (magazine) =

British graphic design magazine

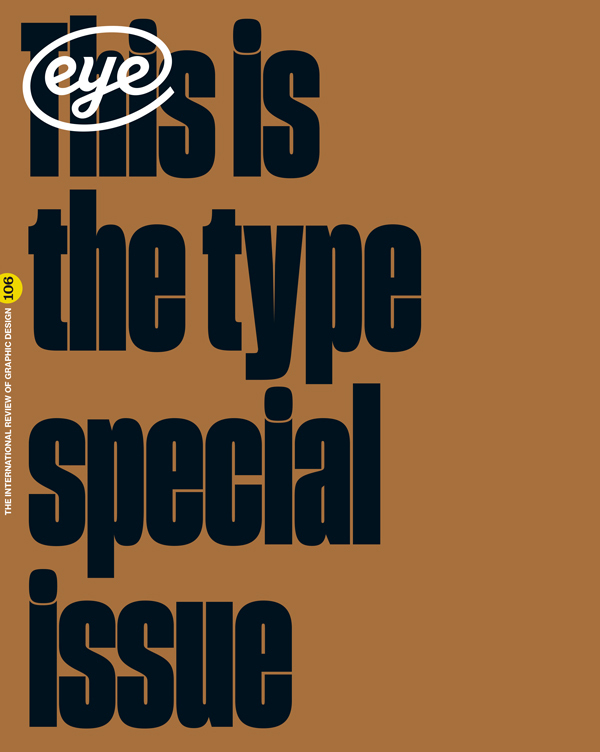
- Eye Magazine, No 106, Summer 2024
- Editor: John L. Walters
- Art Director: Simon Esterson
- Frequency: Quarterly
- Publisher: Eye Magazine Ltd.
- First issue: 1990; 36 years ago
- Company: Eye Magazine Ltd.
- Country: United Kingdom
- Based in: London, England
- Language: English
- Website: eyemagazine.com
- ISSN: 0960-779X
- OCLC: 607593463

Eye magazine is a British quarterly print magazine on graphic design and visual culture.

== History ==
First published in London in 1990, Eye was founded by British writer and graphic designer Rick Poynor. Poynor edited the first twenty-four issues (1990–1997). Max Bruinsma was the second editor, editing issues 25–32 (1997–1999), before its current editor John L. Walters took over in 1999. Stephen Coates was art director for issues 1–26, Nick Bell was art director for issues 27–57, and Simon Esterson has been art director since issue 58.

The magazine design has become the subject of discussion in academic books.

The magazine has had five publishers: Wordsearch, Emap, Quantum Publishing, Haymarket Brand Media and Eye Magazine Ltd, formed by John L. Walters, Simon Esterson and Hannah Tyson in April 2008, after a management buyout.

== Contributors ==
Frequent contributors include Phil Baines, Steven Heller, John-Patrick Hartnett, Richard Hollis, Paul Kahn, Robin Kinross, Jan Middendorp, J. Abbott Miller, John O'Reilly, Rick Poynor, Elizabeth Resnick, Alice Twemlow, Kerry William Purcell, Steve Rigley, Adrian Shaughnessy, David Thompson, Christopher Wilson, Steve Hare and others. Recent issues have included photographs by Philip Sayer, Maria Spann and Francesco Brembati.

Other contributors have included Nick Bell (creative director for issues 27–57), whose article "The steamroller of branding" (published in Eye 53, the "Brand madness" special issue) is frequently cited in discussions about branding. Bell also designed several graphics for the magazine.

Other contributors have included Louise Sandhaus, Gavin Bryars, Anne Burdick, Brendan Dawes, Simon Esterson (art director since issue 58), Malcolm Garrett, Anna Gerber, Jonathan Jones, Emily King, Ellen Lupton, Russell Mills, Quentin Newark, Tom Phillips, Robin Rimbaud, Stefan Sagmeister, Sue Steward, Erik Spiekermann, Teal Triggs, Val Williams and Judith Williamson.

== See also ==
- Communication Arts (magazine)
- Emigre magazine
- Graphis Inc.
- Print (magazine)
- Visible Language
- John L. Walters
- European Design Awards

== Sources ==
- Eye, Nos. 1–12, edited by Rick Poynor, Wordsearch Ltd, London, 1991–1994.
- Eye, Nos. 13–17, edited by Rick Poynor, Emap Architecture, London, 1994–1995.
- Eye, Nos. 18–24, edited by Rick Poynor, Emap Construct, London, 1995–1997.
- Eye, No. 25, edited by Max Bruinsma, Emap Construct, London, 1997.
- Eye, Nos. 26–32, edited by Max Bruinsma, Quantum Publishing, London, 1997–1999.
- Eye, Nos. 33–55, edited by John L. Walters, Quantum Publishing, London, 1999–2005.
- Eye, Nos. 56–66, edited by John L. Walters, Haymarket Brand Media, London, 2005–2008.
- Eye, Nos. 67–109, edited by John L. Walters, Eye Magazine Ltd., London, 2008–2026.
- "John L Walters, Eye", magCulture, 18 August 2017.
- Madeleine Morley, "Cover Story: What the Stack Awards Winner Tells us About the New Rules of Magazine Design", Eye on Design, 21 November 2017.
- MuirMcNeil generated 100 unique Indigo prints from the ten typographic fields designed for Eye 94's 8000 variable-data front covers.
- Article about Eye 94 by Beatriz Camargo
- John L. Walters: The Editor Who Keeps An “Eye” On Graphic Design Worldwide. The Mr. Magazine™ Interview.
