= Rivers, Roads & Rails =

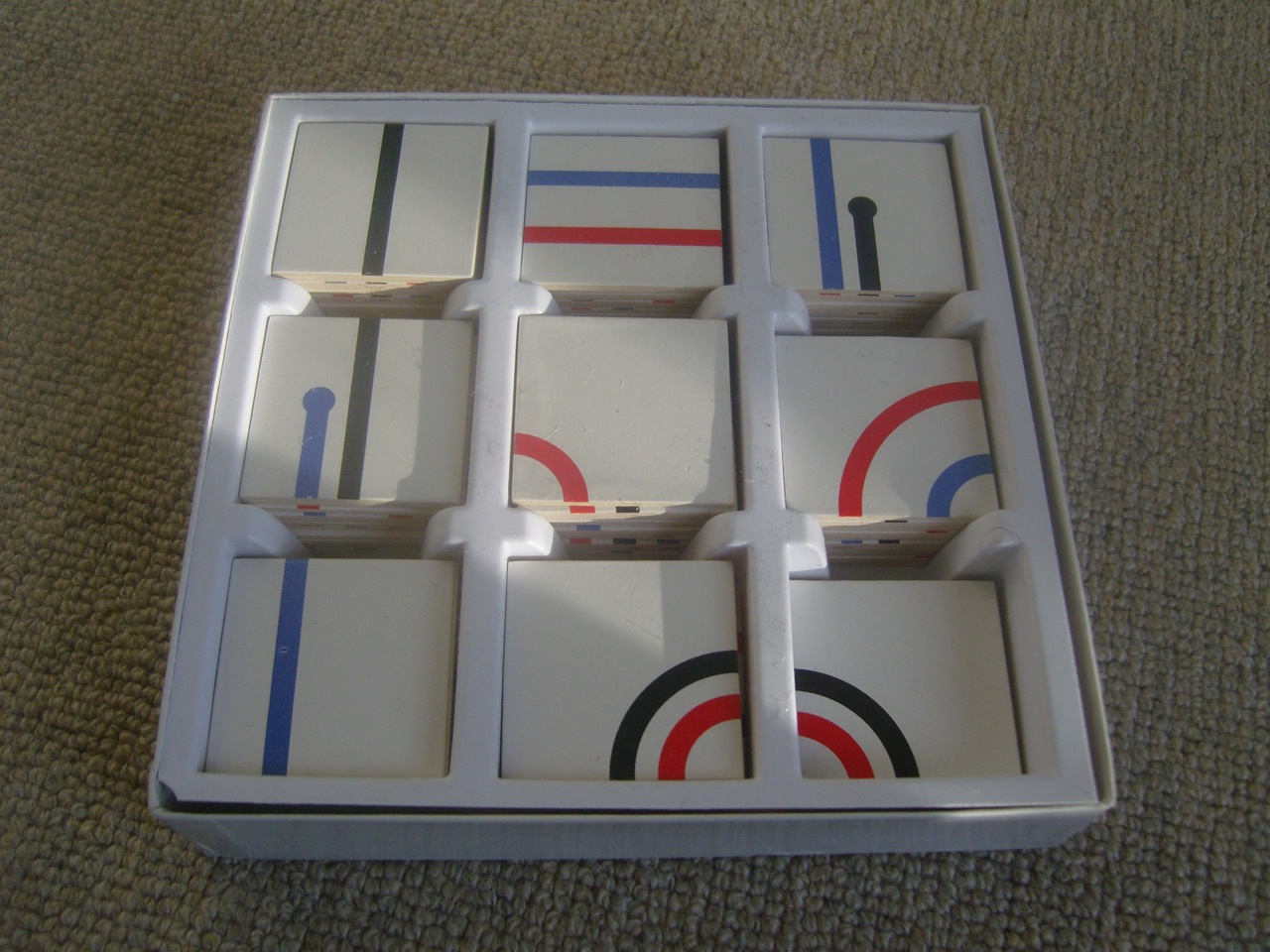
- Inside the original box, showing the tiles
- Players: 1–8
- Setup time: 1 minute
- Playing time: 30 minutes
- Chance: Low
- Age range: 5–adult
- Skills: Planning

Rivers, Roads & Rails is a matching game similar to dominoes, but with 140 square tiles and in some respects similar to Bendomino. The game consists of square card pieces featuring different coloured tracks. The game was created by Ken Garland and Associates and first published in 1969 under the name Connect. Since 1982 it has been produced by Ravensburger, first in an abstract form, and since 1984 under the current theme with artwork by Josef Loeflath.

== Game play ==
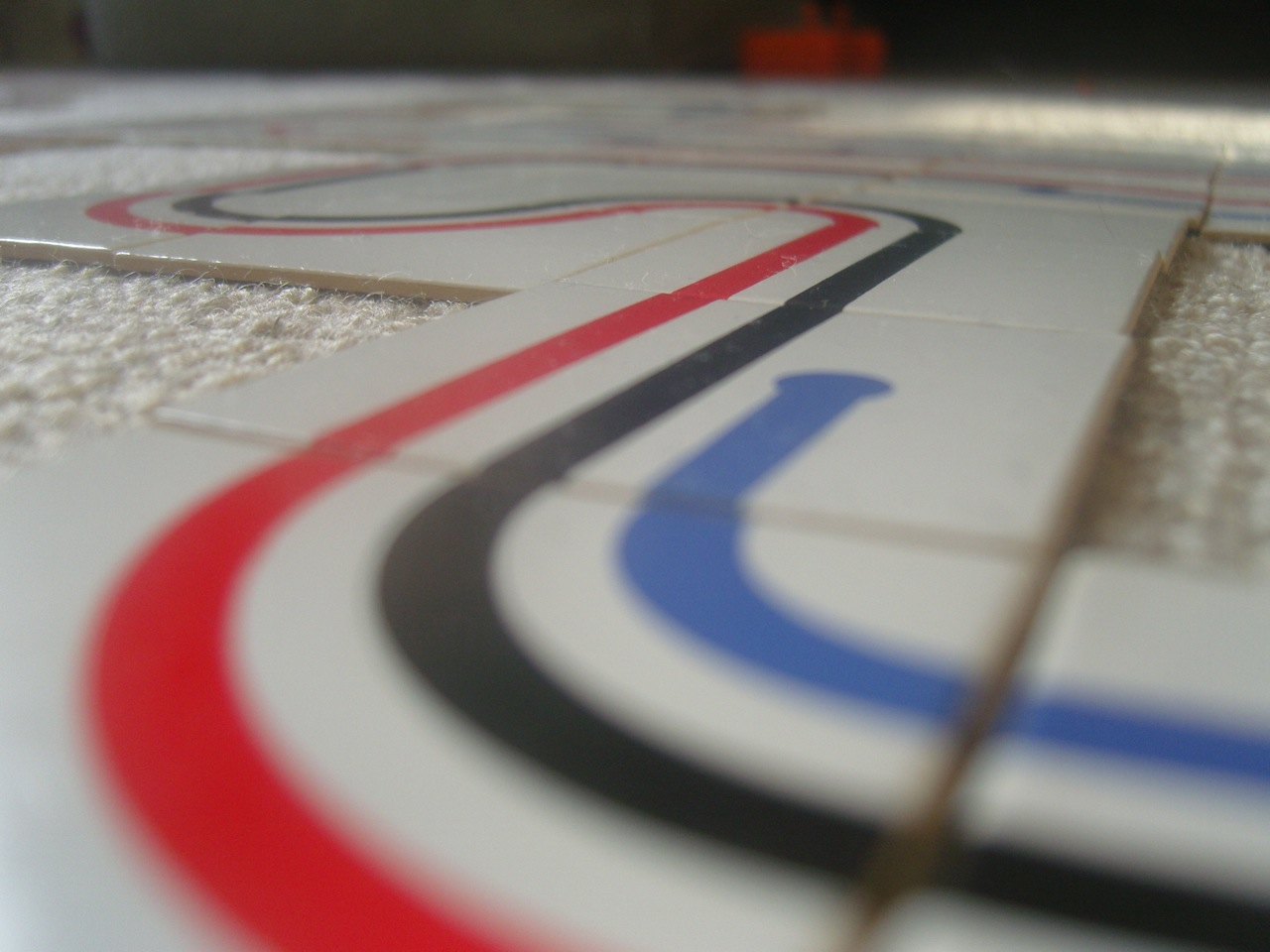
A game in action

=== Setup ===
A large area like a tabletop or the floor is used. The tiles are turned face down and all players randomly draw ten tiles and place them face up in front of them. The youngest player is the first player to start. The starting player randomly chooses a face-down tile, and turns it face up in the center of the play area.

=== Playing ===
Beginning with the starting player, each player on their turn draws a face-down tile (while there are ones remaining). Each tile has at least one of the river, road or rail on it. The player chooses one of his or her tiles and places it so that it matches up with river, road and/or rail on the tiles that have already been played. If that player cannot play a tile, then they must pass. Play then proceeds to the next player (rules don't specify which direction) until all of the tiles of one player have been played, or no one can play a tile.

=== Winning ===
The winner is the person who first plays all of their tiles. If no more tiles can be played, then the winner is the person with the fewest tiles remaining.

Connect enthusiasts wonder if it is possible to arrange the 140 cards in a way so that all lines are closed, without any end left open, and the cards forming a square without a gap. A possible solution would include a square of 10 x 14 cards, which then would resemble the shape of the original cardboard box.

=== Variations ===
Experienced players often vary the rules for making the game more challenging. One version provides for each player taking 35 cards (as long as 4 players are involved), displaying ten cards open in front of him/her and trying, when it is his/her turn, to place as many as possible. Afterwards he/she will refill his/her 10 cards from his/her private stack. A variation of the rules allows removing cards (if this leads to a more compact layout of routes, aiming at a final layout without gaps in the field) and adding the removed card to the next player's private stack.

=== Pieces ===
In more detail, Connect's overall 140 pieces include

a) Regular cards (continuous tracks)

a1) Mono-line

- 14 red cards (6 straight, 4 left turn, 4 right turn)
- 14 blue cards (6 straight, 4 left turn, 4 right turn)
- 14 black cards (6 straight, 8 curved; the black line is in the middle, therefore there is no difference between left and right turn cards)

a2) Double line

- 14 black-red cards (6 straight, 4 left turn, 4 right turn)
- 14 black-blue cards (6 straight, 4 left turn, 4 right turn)
- 14 blue-red cards (6 straight, 4 left turn, 4 right turn)

a3) Triple line

- 14 cards with lines in three colours (6 straight, 4 left turn, 4 right turn)

b) 40 straight switch-track-cards where one or more colour lines stop whereas the other one(s) either continue or start. They can be grouped into 20 pairs similar but mirror-inverted cards.

c) Two split-route pieces which differ one from the other (they are not mirror-inverted) but can be attached one to another at their three-line-side.

== History ==
Ken Garland designed the game with Robert Chapman. Garland produced more games for Galt Toys between 1964 and 1972.

In 1982 the licence for Connect game was transferred to Ravensburger of Germany. In 1984 Garland agreed to a new version using the drawings of Josef Loeflath and it was renamed Rivers, Roads & Rails. Rivers, Roads & Rails is still produced by Ravensburger of Germany. The 1984 game has a different look than the original but has the same gameplay.

== See also ==
- Glossary of domino terms
