= Perniclas Bedow =

Swedish designer

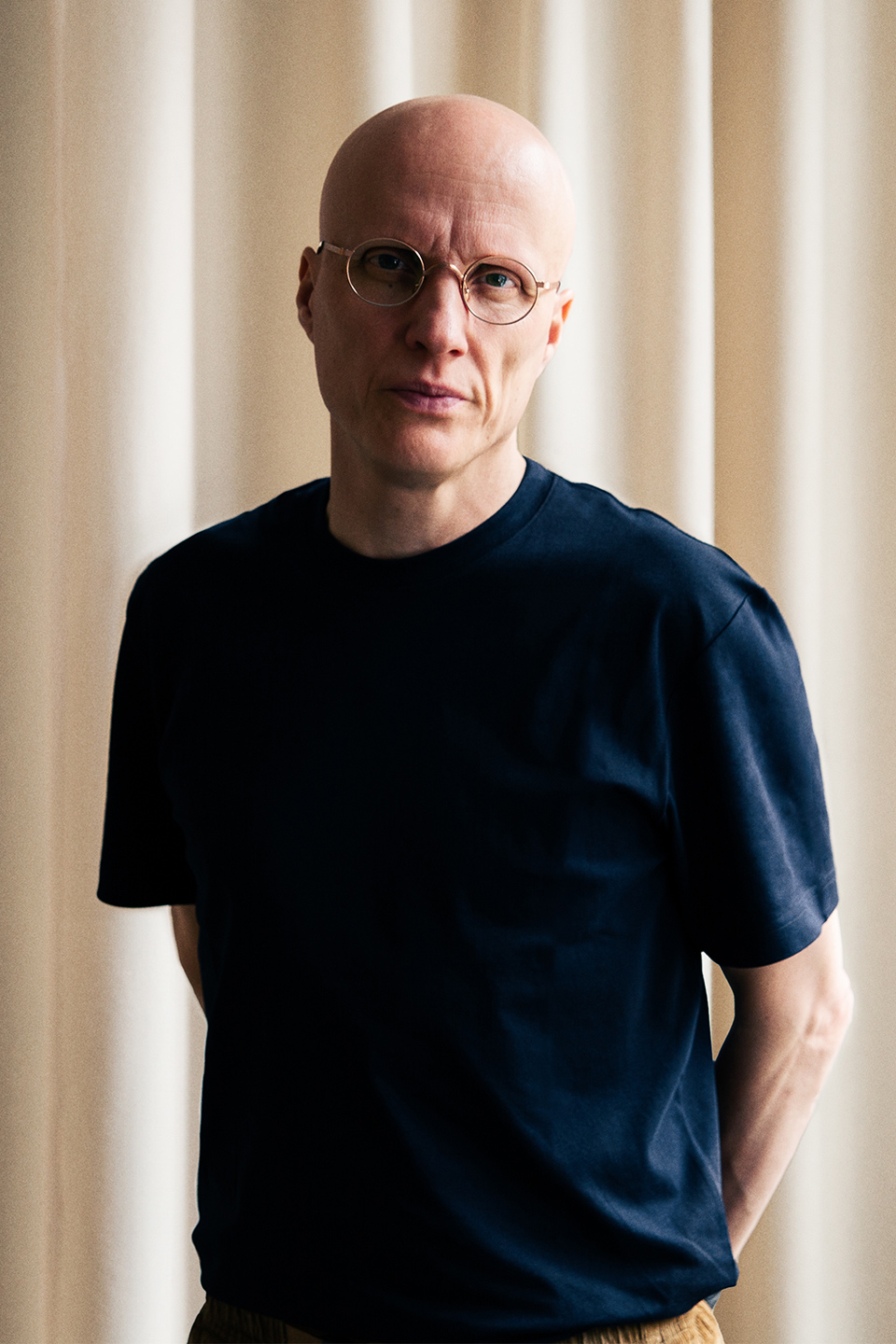
Perniclas Bedow

Perniclas Bedow (born September 17, 1976) is a Swedish graphic designer and the founder of the Stockholm-based design studio Bedow. His work has been featured in international design publications and recognized by organizations including D&AD and Cannes Lions.

== Career ==
In 2005, he founded Bedow, his eponymous design studio based in Stockholm, which focuses on conceptual branding, packaging, and editorial design. The website It's Nice That described his work as having a "simple, thoughtful, practical design that's easy to engage with and comfortable to have around".

One of Bedow's noted projects includes the packaging concept 'A Lovely Atmosphere', for which he received the Excellent Swedish Design award in 2025.

Between 2017 and 2018, Bedow hosted the podcast Grafisk Design, where he interviewed 15 prominent designers in the Swedish design community. The podcast explored various aspects of the design industry, including studio culture, branding, and creative processes.

In 2025, Bedow designed a set of five commemorative postage stamps for Sweden's national postal service PostNord, to celebrate the 100th anniversary of the Svenska Dagbladet Gold Medal. The stamps feature the five athletes who have won the award twice: Björn Borg, Ingemar Stenmark, Anja Pärson, Sarah Sjöström, and Armand Duplantis.

In December 2025, Bedow designed a new club identity for football club Enskede IK. The design received criticism from supporters and was covered in Swedish media including Expressen.

== Lectures and Talks ==
Bedow has spoken at numerous design conferences and institutions around the world, including European Design Awards, The Nordic House, Stockholm University and UnderConsideration's First Round.

== Awards and Recognition ==
Bedow has received numerous international design awards, including Cannes Lions, D&AD and the Type Directors Club.
