= International Council for Children's Play =

International research organization

- Abbreviation: ICCP
- Formation: June 5, 1959; 67 years ago
- Founder: Sylvia Bayr-Klimpfinger; W.J. Bladergroen; Marjorie and Paul Abbatt; Dr. Roderich Thun; Mrs. Lieselotte Pée
- Founded at: Ulm, Germany
- Type: Non-governmental organization
- Board President: Dr. Shelly Newstead, United Kingdom

The International Council for Children's Play (ICCP) is an international, non-governmental organization founded in Ulm, Germany in 1959, with a focus on the promotion of research, practice and policies focused in and around the area of play.

== History ==
The ICCP was founded by a number of professors, early childhood educators and child development professionals from France, Germany and Switzerland. The organization now has members in 30 countries and is governed by a nine-member board.

== Affiliations ==
ICCP is affiliated with The Association for the Study of Play, Alliance for Childhood, and the International Play Association.
