= Zapp Electric Vehicles =

British electric motorcycle manufacturer

Zapp Electric Vehicles Group Limited
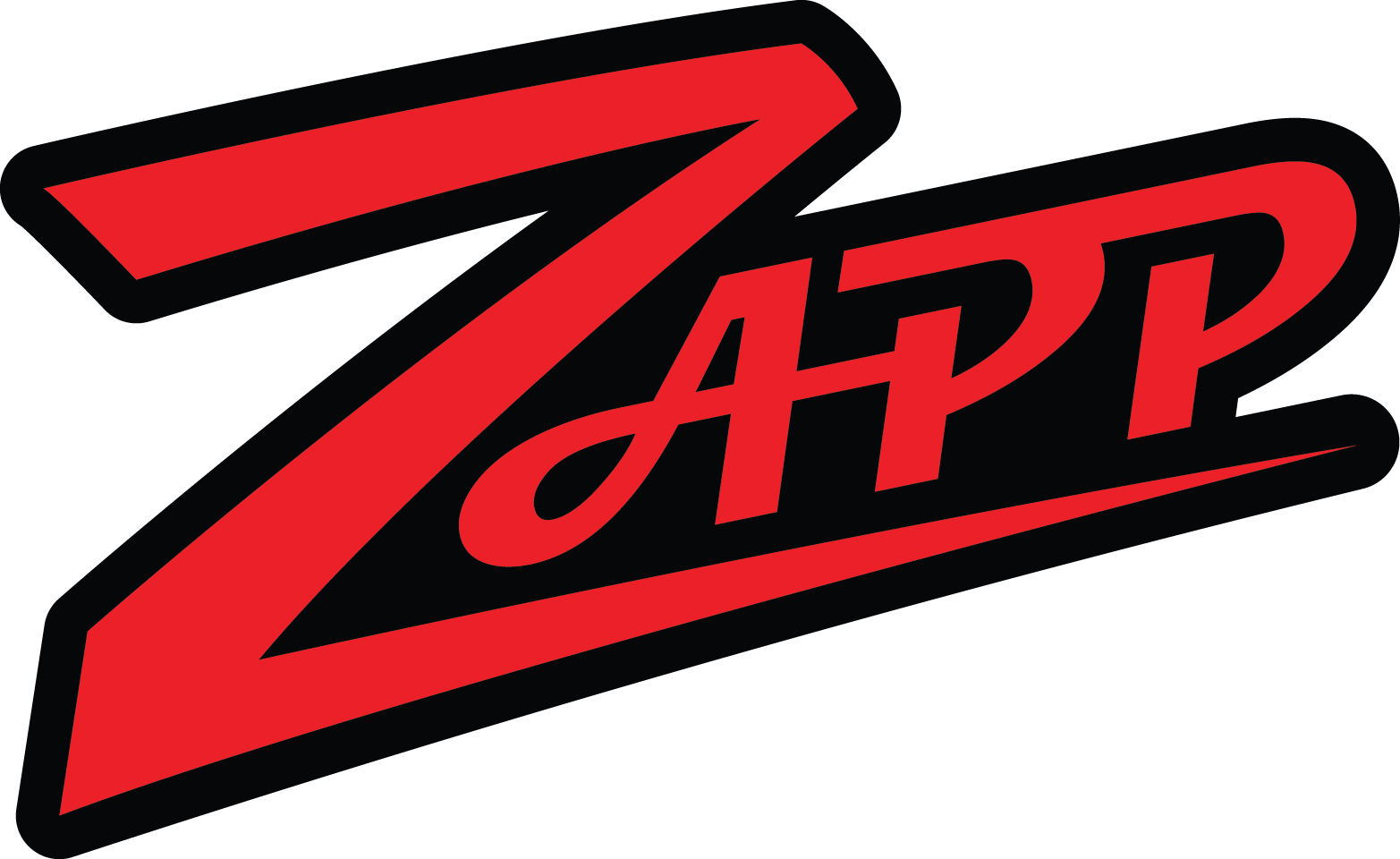
- Company type: Public company
- Traded as: ZAPP
- Industry: Automotive
- Founded: 2017 in the UK
- Headquarters: 5 Technology Park, Colindeep Lane, London, UK
- Products: Urban electric high-performance two-wheeler
- Website: www.zappev.com

Zapp Electric Vehicles (NASDAQ: ZAPP) is a British electric motorcycle manufacturer founded in 2017.

Zapp operates a direct-to-consumer model called DSDTC (Drop-Ship-Direct-to-Customer), through which customers can order vehicles online. Once purchased, bikes are delivered to customers' homes by certified representatives known as "Zappers," who provide inspection, service, and support throughout the ownership period. Zapp Electric Vehicles Limited is a registered trademark in the United Kingdom and other countries.

== Zapp i300 ==
2024 Zapp i300

Its first product, the i300, is an electric urban high-performance two-wheeler designed to deliver motorcycle-like performance in a step-through format (EU L3e-A2).

The i300 is suitable for Europeans with an A2 Licence, as the top speed is electronically restricted to 97 km/h. It has an air cooled Internal Permanent Magnet Motor (IPM) producing 14 kW of peak power and 587 Nm of torque to the rear wheel.

The 90 kg scooter reaches a speed of 50 km/h in 2.35 seconds and 70 km/h in 4.1 seconds. The mid-mounted motor provides power via a carbon fiber belt drive, replacing the chain.

Zapp i300 has a Z-shaped exoskeleton that offers lower center of gravity and reduced weight.The frame is chrome-moly steel tubing.

The i300 uses two removable, lightweight (6 kg each) cell-to-pack configured, Li-NMC, mid-voltage (72V) battery packs. Each battery is rated at 1.25 kWh. They can be used individually or in tandem to create a total energy amount of 2.5 kWh. The batteries can be charged via any universal/domestic 110/220/250V plug-in sockets.

The company intends to sell the model in the UK, Thailand as well as India, where local manufacturer Bounce Electric 1 will handle production and sales.

== Awards ==
- Zapp's i300 Electric Urban Motorcycle won iF DESIGN AWARD 2024
- Zapp's i300 Carbon won Red Dot Product Design Award 2023
- Zapp's i300 won German Design Award 2023
- Zapp's i300 won the Silver Award at the 2019 European Design Award under the Transportation/Alternative Fuel Vehicles category
- Zapp's i300 Carbon won Good Design Award Gold 2022
- Zapp's i300 won the Gold Award at the 2020 MUSE Design Awards
- Zapp's i300 won an A' Design Award & Competition award for the 2019 and 2020 year
