= Ellen Lupton =

American graphic designer (born 1963)

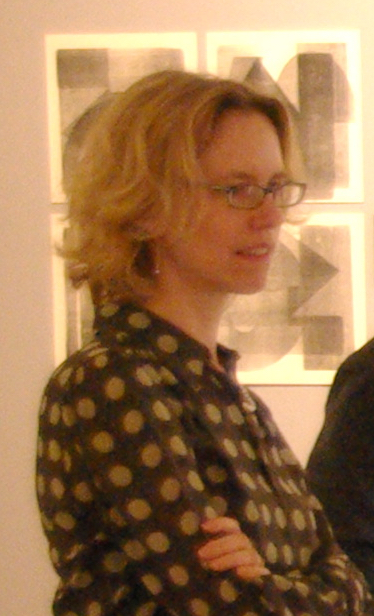
- A portrait of Ellen Lupton
- Born: Ellen Lupton; 1963 (age 62–63); Philadelphia, Pennsylvania, U.S.
- Education: Cooper Union
- Occupations: Writer, curator, educator, and graphic designer
- Movement: DIY, constructionism
- Awards: AIGA Medal (2007)
- Website: http://elupton.com/

Ellen Lupton (born 1963) is a graphic designer, curator, writer, critic, and educator. Known for her love of typography, Lupton is the Betty Cooke and William O. Steinmetz Design Chair at Maryland Institute College of Art. Previously she was the Senior Curator of Contemporary Design at Cooper Hewitt, Smithsonian Design Museum in New York City and was named Curator Emerita after 30 years of service. She is the founding director of the Graphic Design M.F.A. degree program at Maryland Institute College of Art (MICA), where she also serves as director of the Center for Design Thinking. She has written numerous books on graphic design for a variety of audiences. She has contributed to several publications, including Print, Eye, I.D., Metropolis, and The New York Times.

== Early life and education ==
Lupton was born in Philadelphia, Pennsylvania in 1963 and grew up in Baltimore, Maryland. Her parents divorced in 1973 when she and her twin sister, Julia, were ten years old. As a self-professed "art girl" from a family of English teachers, her love of typography combined her love of art and writing.

Lupton attended Cooper Union College in 1981 as a fine art student, where she discovered graphic design and the "expressive potential of typography." Lupton described this discovery of graphic design as "a revelation... Design really wasn't in the mainstream back then. It was esoteric. It was the thing you did if you were very 'neat,' which I wasn't."

== Career ==
After graduating, Lupton was offered a position as curator of the newly-founded Cooper Union Herb Lubalin Study Center of Design and Typography. This combined her long-standing interests in writing and design in her first curatorial position. With an interest in the do-it-yourself movement, Lupton took advantage of limited resources to visually construct the history of graphic design, surprising peers in her ability to meld the visual and verbal. These exhibits provided an arena in which "objects, images, and text functioned as both the method of communication and the subject of inquiry." At this time, Lupton began to write critically about typography and design, utilizing a post-structuralist framework to understand how design is embedded in political, economic, and social contexts, saying, "Typography and architecture are not neutral containers for the content or programs they are thought to neatly accommodate. These are fundamental insights of modern and post-modern thinking." She has cited Ferdinand de Saussure, Roland Barthes, Jacques Derrida, and Michel Foucault as informing her (albeit more populist) work.

In 1992, Lupton joined Cooper Hewitt as curator of contemporary design and began writing books about the design world. She ended her tenure as curator in 2022 and received the honorary designation as curator emerita.

In 1997, Lupton became a chair of the undergraduate graphic design program at MICA. She served in this role until 2002. In 2003, she launched a new MFA program in graphic design at MICA and has served as the director of that program ever since.

== D.I.Y. method ==
Lupton has cited an interest in the rise of social media, the imagining of online spaces, and the do-it-yourself design movements which shape the design industry. With the booming interest in self-help books in the early aughts, Lupton co-wrote D.I.Y.: Design It Yourself with graduate students from MICA. This book showcased ordinary people and new ways of designing their own work, from blog pages to book covers. "People don't just eat food anymore, they present it; they don't look at pictures, they take them; they don't buy T-shirts, they sell them".

== Selected exhibitions ==
- The Senses: Design Beyond Vision, April 3 – October 28, 2018 (Curated with Andrea Lipps). Exploration of experimental works and practical solutions providing new ways to experience the world. Featured work from Christopher Brosius, KunstLAB Arnhem, Studio Roos Meerman, and Maya+Rouvelle.
- Beauty—Cooper Hewitt Design Triennial, February 12 – August 21, 2016. Presented seven kinds of beauty — extravagant, intricate, ethereal, transgressive, transformative, emergent, and elemental — through the international work of 63 designers and teams.
- How Posters Work, April 17, 2015 – January 18, 2016. Showcased the designer's perception in terms of principles of composition, perception, and storytelling, featuring over 125 posters from the Cooper Hewitt collection.
- Graphic Design: Now in Production, October 22, 2011 – January 22, 2012. Explored the broadening reach of graphic design over the past decade from a specialized profession to a widely deployed tool.
- Design for a Living World, May 2009 – January 2010 (Curated with J. Abbott Miller; exhibition designed with J. Abbott Miller, Brian Raby, Jeremy Hoffman, Kristen Spilman/Pentagram). Produced for The Nature Conservancy, this commissioned ten designers to create original product prototypes using materials from ten endangered landscapes. Designers included Yves Béhar, Maya Lin, Isaac Mizrahi, Ezri Tarazi, Kate Spade New York, and J. Abbott Miller.
- Swarm, December 2005 – March 2006. Contemporary art and design from The Fabric Workshop and Museum that reflect the logic of the swarm (simple structures yielding complexity).
- Skin Show, May – September 2002. Brought artificial life into modern furniture, fashion, architecture, and media. Focused on the many different shapes and forms of household furniture.
- Mixing Messages: Graphic Design in Contemporary Culture, Fall 1996 – Winter 1997 (Graphics designed with Jennifer Roos, Frederick Gates, and Christine McKee). Critical survey of graphic design in the US from 1980 to 1995, with a focus on aesthetic, cultural, and technological changes.
- The Avant-Garde Letterhead, Spring 1996 (Curated with Elaine Lustig Cohen, designed with Christine McKee). Showcased original letterheads and ephemera by Herbert Bayer, László Moholy-Nagy, and Le Corbusier.
- Elaine L. Cohen, Modern Graphic Designer, February 7 – May 23, 1995 (Designed with Christine McKee). Focus on the groundbreaking designs of books, book covers, and signage from the 1950s through the 60's.
- Living with AIDS: Education through Design, December 1, 1993 – January 2, 1994. Survey of contemporary AIDS posters addressing diverse audiences.
- Mechanical Brides: Women and Machines from Home to Office, August 17, 1993 – January 2, 1994 (Curated with Sheri Sandler, designed with Boym Studio). Exploration of the design and production of objects central to the women's work throughout the twentieth century, including the washing machine, telephone, electric iron, and typewriter. Considered a visual history of the relationship between women and "feminine" appliances.

== Publications ==
=== Books ===
- Thinking with Type, 3rd revised and expanded edition: A Critical Guide for Designers, Writers, Editors, & Students, Princeton Architectural Press, 2024. ISBN 978-1797226828
- Lupton, Ellen (2020). Herbert Bayer: Inspiration and Process in Design. Princeton Architectural Press. ISBN 978-1616899530.
- Lupton, Ellen (2019). The ABC's of Triangle, Circle, Square: The Bauhaus and Design Theory. Princeton Architectural Press. ISBN 978-1616897987.
- Lupton, Ellen (2018). The Senses: Design Beyond Vision. Princeton Architectural Press. ISBN 978-1616897109.
- Lupton, Ellen (2017). Design is Storytelling. Cooper Hewitt, Smithsonian Design Museum. ISBN 978-1942303190.
- Graphic Design: The New Basics, Revised and Second Edition (With Jennifer Cole Phillips), Princeton Architectural Press, 2015. (ISBN 978-1616893323)
- How Posters Work (With Caitlin Condell and Gail Davidson), Cooper Hewitt, Smithsonian Design Museum, 2015. (ISBN 978-0910503822)
- Beauty: Cooper Hewitt Design Triennial (With Andrea Lipps), Cooper Hewitt, Smithsonian Design Museum, 2015. (ISBN 978-1942303114)
- Beautiful Users, Princeton Architectural Press, 2014. (ISBN 978-1616892913)
- Type On Screen, Princeton Architectural Press, 2014. (ISBN 978-1616891701)
- Graphic Design Thinking: Beyond Brainstorming, Princeton Architectural Press, 2011. (ISBN 978-1568989792)
- Thinking with Type, 2nd revised and expanded edition: A Critical Guide for Designers, Writers, Editors, & Students, Princeton Architectural Press, 2010. (ISBN 978-1568989693)
- Design Your Life: The Pleasures and Perils of Everyday Things, St. Martin's Griffin, 2009. (ISBN 978-0312532734)
- Indie Publishing: How to Design and Produce Your Own Book, Princeton Architectural Press, 2008. (ISBN 978-1568987606)
- Design Writing Research (With J. Abbott Miller), Phaidon Press, 1999, 2000, 2003, 2004, 2006, 2008. (ISBN 978-0714838519)
- D.I.Y.: Design It Yourself, Princeton Architectural Press, 2006. (ISBN 978-1568985527)
- Feeding Desire: Design and the Tools of the Table, 1500–2005 (With Sarah D. Coffin, Darra Goldstein, and Barbara Bloemink), Assouline, 2005. (ISBN 978-2843238451)
- Swarm: The Fabric Workshop and Museum (With J. Abbott Miller), Fabric Workshop and Museum, 2005. (ISBN 978-0972455626)
- Thinking with Type: A Critical Guide for Designers, Writers, Editors, & Students, Princeton Architectural Press, 2004. (ISBN 978-1568984483)
- Inside Design Now: The National Design Triennial (With Donald Albrecht, Mitchell Owens, and Susan Yelavich), Princeton Architectural Press, 2003. (ISBN 978-1568983950)
- Skin: Surface, Substance, Design, Princeton Architectural Press, 2002. (ISBN 978-1568987118)
- Graphic Design: The New Basics (With Jennifer Cole Phillips), Princeton Architectural Press, 2008 (ISBN 978-1568987705)
- D.I.Y. Kids (With Julia Lupton), Princeton Architectural Press, 2007. (ISBN 978-1568987071)
- Inside Design Now", Princeton Architectural Press, 2003. (ISBN 978-1568983950)
- Mechanical Brides: Women and Machines from Home to Office, Princeton Architectural Press, 1997. (ISBN 978-1878271976)
- The Bathroom, the Kitchen, and the Aesthetics of Waste (A Process of Elimination) (With J. Abbott Miller), Princeton Architectural Press, 1997. (ISBN 978-1568980966)
- Mixing Messages: Graphic Design in Contemporary Culture, Princeton Architectural Press, 1996. (ISBN 978-1568980997)
- The ABC's of Bauhaus, the Bauhaus and Design Theory, Princeton Architectural Press, 1991. (ISBN 978-1878271426)

=== Books published by Lupton ===
- Lupton, Ellen (2008). Sexy Librarian. Slush Editions. ISBN 978-0615176772.

== Awards and honors ==
- 2019: American Academy of Arts and Sciences Fellow.
- 2007: AIGA Gold Medal for Lifetime Achievement, AIGA.
- 2000: AIGA Fifty Books/Fifty Covers award, for "Design Culture Now" invitation design.
- 1999: Recipient, Iris Award for History of Decorative Arts, Bard Graduate Center.
- 1999: I.D. Magazine Distinction Award, packaging category, for Graphic Design in the Mechanical Age.
- 1998: AIGA Fifty Books/Fifty Covers award, for "Graphic Design in the Mechanical Age: Selections from the Merrill C. Berman Collection".
- 1999: First place, American Association of Museums publication design award, for Graphic Design in the Mechanical Age.
- 1997: Norton Family Foundation's Curator's Grant, $50,000 grant for exhibition development.
- 1996: Winner, 1996 New York Magazine Award. Awarded to 10 New Yorkers who are shaping the life of the city.
- 1993: Recipient of the Chrysler Design Award, with J. Abbott Miller.
- 1992–1995: AIGA, National Board of Directors.
- 1994–present: panelist, New York State Council on the Arts.
- 1995: Juror, Architectural League's Young Architects Competition.
- 1994: Winner, Best of Show award, Aldus Magazine annual design competition, 1994 for design of book, "The IOO Show".
- 1993: Chair, American Center for Design "100 Show".

== See also ==
- Cooper-Hewitt, National Design Museum
- Maryland Institute College of Art
- List of AIGA medalists
- First Things First 2000 manifesto
- Emigre 51: First Things First, 1999.
