= Octonal =

Octonal may be:

- an adjective referring to an octal (base-8) number system
- a name for the mixture of cyclotetramethylenetetranitramine, trinitrotoluene and aluminium

== See also ==
- Octon (disambiguation)
- Octanal, an aldehyde
- Octanol, an alcohol
- Octenol, an alcohol
- Octagonal
