= Marjorie Abbatt =

English toy-maker and businesswoman

Marjorie Abbatt, née Norah Marjorie Cobb (18 March 1899 – 10 November 1991), was an English toy-maker and businesswoman.

== Early life and marriage ==
She was born in Surbiton, the daughter of Edward Rhodes Cobb (1872–1965), a fur broker, and his wife Marion Murray née Thomson (1875–1971), and was educated at Roedean School. After studies at Somerville College, Oxford, where she graduated B.A. in 1923, she married (Cyril) Paul Abbatt in December 1930, giving up postgraduate work at University College, London. Paul, born 1899 in Bolton, was from a Quaker family, and a graduate of Trinity Hall, Cambridge, and then taught at Sidcot School. He was influenced by Woodcraft Chivalry, and this interest led to the couple meeting in 1926 at a gathering at Godshill, Hampshire. He had been a conscientious objector of World War I. His father George William Abbatt was a merchant in cane, and was involved in Bolton in the manufacture of basketry skips.

== Influences ==
Intending to set up a progressive school, Paul and Marjorie Abbatt travelled to Vienna as educational research. There they met Franz Cižek at the Vienna School of Arts and Crafts. They attended his classes, and Montessori kindergartens in Vienna. They also encountered Milan Morgenstern and Helena Löw-Beer, working in the field of special education.

Another influence was Susan Sutherland Isaacs, through her book Intellectual Growth in Young Children (1931). In it she wrote "We see no reason to let the school and its conventions stand between the child and the real situations in the world". According to Paul Abbatt's obituary in The Times, when asked why he gave up teaching, he replied "to break through the barriers that separated me from life." He brought back educational toys from Vienna. Eva Brück, Morgenstern's daughter, commented that Paul wanted to develop her father's ideas, to make and sell toys.

== Toy business ==
In 1932, the couple set up Abbatt Toys, a toy manufacturer. Their philosophy was that toys should be functional in design as well as educational in play. In 1932, they held a toy exhibition in their Bloomsbury flat. They set up a mail-order business, with a catalogue illustrated by John Skeaping. In 1934 they had a catalogue with photographs by Edith Tudor-Hart. In October 1933 they were introduced to Nikolaus Pevsner, who found them inclined to Marxism, by the Quaker John Fletcher.

The architect Ernő Goldfinger moved to London in 1934, and that year designed a showroom for the Abbatts in Endsleigh Street. The following year he created a logo and children's alphabet for them; and in 1936 a toy shop at 94 Wimpole Street, as well as a design for their Tavistock Square apartment. Children were encouraged to touch and play with the toys on display; their toys won acclaim. At the Paris Exposition Internationale des Arts et Techniques dans la Vie Moderne in 1937, the British Pavilion had a playroom by Goldfinger and the Abbatts. "Finished in primary colours, in simple shapes that stimulated a child's creative instincts, the Abbatts' products were almost Bauhaus toys." Goldfinger worked for the Abbatts again, with a design for a dairy farm and bungalow at Turville in Buckinghamshire.

Children's Play Activities Ltd, set up by the Abbatts, ran conferences. A forum and pressure group for educational toys, it produced in 1957 a report on toy manufacturing critical of the British industry. In the late 1950s the designer Ken Garland worked for the Abbatts for three years on their catalogue and graphics, before leaving with Edward Newmark to join Galt Toys.

In 1969 the Abbatt climbing frame, designed in the early 1930s, won The Observer newspaper design award. Marjorie Abbatt was also made president of the International Council for Children's Play, an organization which she originally co-founded.

== Later life ==
Paul Abbatt died in 1971, and Marjorie sold the toy business in 1973. In 1981, she was made an honorary M.A. by the University of Nottingham.

She died on 10 November 1991, at home in Oxford.
