= Henua Organics =

Finnish natural skincare brand

- Company type: Private
- Industry: Natural skincare, cosmetics
- Founded: 2017
- Founders: Jenni Tuominen, Anu Kohtamäki
- Headquarters: Etelä-Pohjanmaa, Finland
- Area served: Worldwide
- Products: Organic skincare, facial oils, toners, moisturizers
- Website: https://www.henuaofficial.com

Henua Organics is a Finnish luxury natural skincare brand founded in 2017 by sisters Jenni Tuominen and Anu Kohtamäki. All Henua products are manufactured in Etelä-Pohjanmaa, Finland.

== History ==
Henua Organics was founded after Jenni began experiencing skin sensitivity caused by synthetic and lab-made ingredients in conventional skincare. Motivated to find solutions, she began her study of organic skincare. Having grown up in Finland, Jenni and her sister Anu were deeply familiar with the healing properties of Nordic nature. They recalled their grandmother gathering berries and herbs from the pristine Finnish forests for food and natural remedies. Production began in late 2018.

== Recognition ==
Since its launch, Henua Organics has received multiple international awards and recognition for its clean formulations and Nordic-inspired design, winning Best Branding in the European Design Awards in 2019. The brand also won the Beauty Shortlist Awards 2023 for "Best Natural/Organic Brand – Scandinavia".

Henua Organics has been featured in numerous international publications, including Vogue Scandinavia, Vogue Italy, AD Italy, Vogue Japan, WWD Japan, Biteki, and Marie Claire, among others.

== Products ==
The product range includes organic oil cleanser, toner, facial oil, moisturizer, eye serum, and mask made without synthetic fragrances or parabens. Each formula features active natural ingredients derived from Nordic plants and botanicals. The minimalist Scandinavian packaging design reflects the brand's philosophy of purity and balance.
