= Elizabeth Resnick =

American graphic designer, curator, and writer

- Born: New York City, United States
- Education: Rhode Island School of Design
- Occupations: Graphic designer, curator, writer
- Employer(s): Massachusetts College of Art and Design
- Known for: Design education; curation of international poster exhibitions
- Title: Professor Emerita of Graphic Design

Elizabeth Resnick is an American graphic designer, curator, and writer. She is professor emerita and former chairperson of the Graphic Design Department at the Massachusetts College of Art and Design (MassArt). She is noted for her design practice, her teaching and publications on design education, and her curation of international poster exhibitions on political and social themes.

== Early life and education ==
Resnick attended the High School of Art & Design in New York City from 1963 to 1966. She studied graphic design at the Rhode Island School of Design (RISD), where she earned a Bachelor of Fine Arts in 1970 and a Master of Fine Arts in 1996.

== Career ==
Resnick operated the independent studio Elizabeth Resnick Design in Boston from 1973 to 2003. Her clients included Ciba Corning Diagnostics Corporation, Art New England, Store 24, the Animal Rescue League of Boston, AIGA Boston, Massachusetts College of Art, and several local schools and non-profit cultural organizations.

She joined MassArt as a part-time faculty member in 1977 and was promoted to full-time tenure track in 1999. She later served as chair of the Graphic Design Department before being named professor emerita. Her teaching emphasized conceptual problem-solving, typography, and socially engaged design.

In November 2007, she received the AIGA Boston Fellows Award. In October 2025, she was awarded the AIGA Medal in recognition of her achievements during her decades-long career as an educator, curator, and author, which has redefined design pedagogy and amplified underrepresented voices in the global design canon.

== Curatorial projects ==
Resnick has curated and/or co-curated seven major international poster exhibitions addressing political, cultural, and social issues:

- Within/Without: The Art of Russell Mills (with Teresa Flavin, 1991)
- Dutch Graphic Design: 1918–1945 (with Alston Purvis, 1994)
- The Art of the Poster: Makoto Saito (with Jan Kubasiewicz, 1999)
- The Graphic Imperative: International Posters of Peace, Social Justice and the Environment 1965–2005 (with Chaz Maviyane-Davies and Frank Baseman, 2005)
- Graphic Intervention: 25 Years of International AIDS Awareness Posters 1985–2010 (with Javier Cortés, 2010)
- Graphic Advocacy: International Posters for the Digital Age 2001–2012 (2012)
- Women’s Rights Are Human Rights: International Posters on Gender-based Inequality, Violence and Discrimination (2016)

== Publications ==
Resnick has authored and edited books and exhibition catalogues, including:

- Graphic Design: A Problem-Solving Approach to Visual Communication (Prentice-Hall, 1984)
- Design for Communication: Conceptual Graphic Design Basics (Wiley, 2003)
- Developing Citizen Designers (Bloomsbury Academic, 2016; updated 2023)
- The Social Design Reader (Bloomsbury, 2019)
- Women Graphic Designers: Rebalancing the Canon (Bloomsbury Visual Arts, 2025)
- Exhibition catalogues for Dutch Graphic Design: 1918–1945, The Art of the Poster: Makoto Saito, The Graphic Imperative, Graphic Intervention, Graphic Advocacy, and Women’s Rights Are Human Rights.

She has contributed essays, interviews, and reviews to periodicals including Eye (UK), IDEA (Japan), Grafik (UK), tipoGrafica (Argentina), Graphis (US), and the AIGA Journal of Graphic Design. She co-authored, with Robert Wiesenberger, the essay “From Basel to Boston: An Itinerary for Modernist Typography in America,” published in Design Issues in 2018.

Her research has also focused on under-recognized women designers. She authored profiles of Thérèse Moll, Jacqueline Casey, Tomoko Miho, and Henrietta Condak in Eye magazine between 2019 and 2025.
