= Dieline =

Graphic design element

A dieline is used in graphic design as a placeholder for assisting in the proper layout of a document that will be diecut as part of the finishing process. Dielines can also indicate perforation, cutting, and folding marks for flat packaging. It is usually placed into the graphic's computer file as a separate layer for sizing and orientation purposes. A dieline is usually not printed on the final piece but is used to determine correct layout. They are useful both for aesthetic purposes and to avoid manufacturing errors by acting as a blueprint. A Dieline can be created using graphic design software like Adobe Illustrator.

Dielines are traditionally used when designing:

- Envelopes
- Pocket folders
- Packaging
