= Les Graphiquants =

Les Graphiquants is a design consultancy based in Paris, France, with a reputation for serving the cultural field and the arts.

== History ==
Les Graphiquants were founded in Paris in 2008 by two creative directors, Romain Rachlin and Maxime Tétard, who studied together at the École Nationale Supérieure des Arts Décoratifs in Paris. They have since been joined by Cyril Taïeb and Françios Dubois.

In 2011, they received international fame by winning the European Design Agency of the Year award at a ceremony held in Vilnius, Lithuania.

== Projects and clients ==
Cultural organizations such as the Centre Pompidou, the Pinault Collection, the Centre National des Arts Plastiques and the Biennale de Danse de Lyon have helped Les Graphiquants forge a reputation that is closely linked to this particular market.

However, Les Graphiquants’ clients also include mainstream brands such as Christian Dior, Sony, Universal, BNP Paribas and Canal +.

== Style ==
According to R. Klanten, A. Sinofzik and F. Schulze in their book Culture Identities, "...At first sight, Les Graphiquants’ work seems to be interested in the image, rather than the word, concerned with style, rather than content. In fact, it is very responsive to both… The grandeur of the expression feels typically French. Les Graphiquants’ style may not build on their country’s design heritage: they are 'very proud of France’s graphic history from Cassandre to Grapus' but certain that 'French design doesn’t exist anymore'. However, their visual language bears remarkable similarities to their mother tongue in its rhythm and melody, vocal symphonic texture, accents and round-bellied visual vowels…"
