= Vince Frost =

British executive, graphic designer, and author (born 1964)

- Born: 1964 (age 61–62); Brighton, England

Vince Frost (born November 1964) is a British executive, graphic designer, and author. He is the founder, CEO and executive creative director of international design studio Frost Collective (stylized as Frost*collective).

== Early life and education ==
Vince Frost was born in Brighton, England, and raised in Vancouver after moving to Canada with his family at the age of 2. He returned to the United Kingdom as a teenager and completed his design education at West Sussex College of Design.

== Career ==
In 1989 Frost got a job at the London office of the design firm Pentagram, before becoming their youngest associate, just a few years later, at the age of 27. In 1994 he formed his own design consultancy, Frost Design where he created work for clients such as The Independent and Nike. In 1999, Frost was one of the signees of the First Things First 2000 manifesto.

Frost relocated to Sydney in 2003, and has since been running an international design studio of 40 people Frost Collective. He re-opened the London branch of Frost Collective in 2023 and moved back to London in 2025.

In 2006 Vince held a retrospective exhibition, Frost Bite, at Sydney Opera House. The exhibit was accompanied by a 500-page book of Frost's work titled Frost* (sorry trees) published by Thames & Hudson.

In November 2014 Frost released his second publication, a self-help book titled Design Your Life, published by Penguin. The book featured 15 principles for personal improvement. He started the Design Your Life podcast, a long-running podcast inspired by the book, in 2018. It aims to teach listeners to use design thinking to improve their lives and features conversations with over 150 guest creatives.

== Awards and recognition ==
Frost is a member of AGI and an honorary member of ISTD. He is an executive committee member of Design and Art Direction (D&AD). He has won awards from the New York Society of Publication Designers, D&AD, the Art Directors Club of New York and Tokyo, among others. In 2024 Frost received the Australian Design Prize in recognition for his significant impact in Australian design over the course of his career.
