= Merrill C. Berman =

Merrill C. Berman (born 1938) is a New York-based art collector. Over almost fifty years, Berman has built a major collection of early 20th century Russian and European art and graphic design. According to Linda Shearer, former Director of the Williams College Museum of Art, and Dianne H. Pilgrim, former Director of the Cooper-Hewitt National Design Museum, Smithsonian Institution, “The Merrill C. Berman Collection represents an exemplary effort to collect printed ephemera with an eye for both its aesthetic and its social significance. The collection is replete with masterpieces of graphic design created by some of the most influential artists of the [twentieth] century as well as with pieces by unknown designers whose work has been rescued from oblivion by Merrill Berman’s keen eye.”

In addition to early 20th century holdings by well-known artists such as Hannah Höch, El Lissitzky, and Aleksandr Rodchenko, Berman has also collected the work of less familiar members of the avant-garde, as well as cause-oriented material. “Merrill C. Berman may be the most important collector you never heard of,” notes art historian Jane Kallir.

In 2017, The Museum of Modern Art, New York made a "transformative" acquisition from the Merrill C. Berman Collection, comprising over 300 early 20th century works. An exhibition based on the acquisition, "Engineer, Agitator, Constructor: The Artist Reinvented," was on view from December 13, 2020 to April 10, 2021. A major catalogue was published.

== Early life ==
Berman was born in Boston, Massachusetts in 1938. As an undergraduate at Harvard University, he focused on history and political science. He went on to attend Columbia Business School. Roger Malbert, senior curator at the Hayward Gallery, London writes, "Merrill C. Berman's career as a research analyst and investor has enabled him to assemble one of the most comprehensive archives of its kind. His collection documents every stage of Modernist development in the twentieth century and rivals in quality, cohesion and range most public collections in the United States, Europe and Japan."

== Prominent collecting areas ==
- Bauhaus
- Constructivism
- Dada
- De Stijl
- Kultur Liga
- Neue Sachlichkeit

== Selected publications on the collection ==
- Engineer, Agitator, Constructor: The Artist Reinvented. Jodi Hauptman and Adrian Sudhalter, eds. New York: The Museum of Modern Art, 2020.
- The Merrill C. Berman Collection at the Fundación Juan March. Texts by Manuel Fontán del Junco and interview with Merrill C. Berman. Madrid: Fundación Juan March, 2012.
- Photomontage Between the Wars, 1918-1939. Madrid and Ottawa: Fundación Juan March and Carlton University Art Museum, 2012.
- Avant-Garde Graphics, 1918–1934: From the Merrill C. Berman Collection. London: Hayward Gallery Publishing, 2004.
- Graphic Design in the Mechanical Age: Selections from the Merrill C. Berman Collection. Deborah Rothschild, Ellen Lupton and Darra Goldstein. New Haven: Yale University Press in conjunction with Williams College Museum of Art and Cooper-Hewitt National Design Museum, Smithsonian Institution, 1998.
- Building the Collective: Soviet Graphic Design 1917-1937, Selections from the Merrill C. Berman Collection. NY: Princeton Architectural Press, 1996.
- The 20th Century Poster: Design of the Avant-Garde. New York: Abbeville Press, 1984.

== Selected collection exhibitions ==
- "Carl Grossberg: Selections from the Merrill C. Berman Collection," Busch-Reisinger Museum, Harvard University, Cambridge (August 4–December 12, 2017 and December 15, 2017–July 22, 2018).
- "Art as Activism: Graphic Art from the Merrill C. Berman Collection," New York Historical Society (June 26, 2015- September 13, 2015).
- "American Masterworks from the Merrill C. Berman Collection" Alexandre Gallery, New York (May 14-June 26, 2015).
- "Elegance and Extravagance: Japanese Posters from the Merrill C. Berman Collection" Ackland Art Museum, University of North Carolina, Chapel Hill (September 7, 2012- January 6, 2013).
- "The Avant-Garde Applied, 1890-1950," Fundación Juan March, Madrid (March 30-July 1, 2012).
- “The Great Utopia: The Russian and Soviet Avant-Garde 1915-1932,” Schirn Kunsthalle, Frankfurt, (March 1-May 10, 1992); Stedelijk Museum, Amsterdam (June 5-August 23, 1992); and the Solomon R. Guggenheim Museum, New York (September 25-December 15, 1992).
