= 2wice =

Cover of 2wice

2wice is an interdisciplinary magazine dedicated to contemporary dance, visual and performing arts. Patsy Tarr is the founder and editor in chief of 2wice and president of the 2wice Arts Foundation. The 2wice Arts Foundation is based in New York City. The magazine is designed and co-edited by J. Abbott Miller of Pentagram. The magazine debuted in 1997.

Before 2wice, Tarr and Abbot had collaborated in similar roles to produce Dance Ink, a quarterly journal that appeared from 1989 through 1996.

The publishers of 2wice have also produced other publications – Mah Jongg, False Start, Green World: Merce Cunningham, Everybody Dance Now, Geoffrey Beene and John Kelly – and an iPad app, Merce Cunningham Event. Dance 2wice, a book of essays collected from 2wice was published in 2004. An exhibition, Everybody Dance Now, was held at AIGA in New York City in 2009. The exhibition featured work resulting from the collaboration of Tarr and Miller.

The publication was named "Magazine of the Year" by the Society of Publication Designers in 2006. The magazine is also in the collection of the San Francisco Museum of Modern Art.
