= J. Abbott Miller =

American graphic designer

Abbott Miller
- Education: Cooper Union
- Known for: Graphic Design
- Notable work: Sotheby's identity system, Barnes Foundation environmental graphics
- Awards: AIGA Medal

J. Abbott Miller or Abbott Miller (born 1962) is an American graphic designer and writer, and a partner at Pentagram, which he joined in 1999.

== Biography ==
Abbott Miller was born in Indiana and studied at the Cooper Union School of Art in New York.

In 1989 he founded the multidisciplinary studio Design/Writing/Research where, in collaboration with Ellen Lupton, he pioneered the concept of “designer as author” undertaking projects in which content and form are developed in a symbiotic relationship. He joined the New York office of the design firm Pentagram as a partner in 1999. Miller is married to Ellen Lupton. Miller's projects are often concerned with the cultural role of design and the public life of the written word. At Pentagram he leads a team designing identities, exhibitions, environmental graphics, books, magazines, and web and interactive projects. He is the designer and editor of 2wice magazine.

== Awards ==
Miller has received numerous design honors, including medals from the Society for Publication Designers, the Art Directors Club, and the AIGA. In 1994, Miller––together with Ellen Lupton––was awarded the first annual Chrysler Award for Innovation in Design. He is also the recipient of the Augustus St. Gaudens Award from Cooper Union, and received the AIGA medal in 2014. He is a visiting critic in the Graduate Design Program at the Maryland Institute College of Art in Baltimore. His work is represented in the collections of the Cooper-Hewitt National Design Museum, the San Francisco Museum of Modern Art, the Art Institute of Chicago, and the Bibliothèque nationale de France. His work and critical writing has appeared in Eye, Print, I.D., and other publications, and he is the co-author of four books, including Design/Writing/Research: Writing on Graphic Design. A survey of his design work was published by Princeton Architectural Press in September 2014.

== See also ==
- List of AIGA medalists
- First Things First 2000 manifesto
- Emigre 51: First Things First, 1999.
- Abbott Miller bio at AIGA.org
- Abbott Miller bio at pentagram.com

== Books ==
- Bathroom, the Kitchen, and the Aesthetics of Waste, with Ellen Lupton, Princeton Architectural Press, 1996. (ISBN 1568980965)
- Dimensional Typography: Case Studies on The Shape of Letters in Virtual Environments, Princeton Architectural Press, 1997. (ISBN 978-1568980898)
- Dance 2wice, with Patsy Tarr, Phaidon Press, 2004. (ISBN 978-0714843650)
- Abbott Miller: Design and Content, Princeton Architectural Press, 2014. (ISBN 978-1568987262)
