= Octon =

Octon may refer to:

- Octons toy, sets of interlocking plastic octagons by Galt Toys
- Octon, East Riding of Yorkshire, England
- Octon, Hérault, France
- Octon (eclipse cycle), a type of eclipse cycle in astronomy
- Octon (Dungeons & Dragons), fictional creature in Dungeons and Dragons
