= Alliance for Childhood =

Non-profit research and advocacy organization

The Alliance for Childhood is a tax-exempt nonprofit research and advocacy organization founded in February 1999, incorporated in the U.S. state of Maryland, and based in College Park, Maryland. A partnership of educators, health professionals, researchers, and other advocates for children, some of whom are supporters of Waldorf education, its stated mission is to "promote policies and practices that support children’s healthy development, love of learning, and joy in living. Our public education campaigns bring to light both the promise and the vulnerability of childhood. We act for the sake of the children themselves and for a more just, democratic, and ecologically responsible future."

== Activities ==
The Alliance's work in its first ten years has focused on the following issues:

- Defending and restoring child-initiated, open-ended play in and out of school.
- Challenging the overuse of computers in education and the proliferation of electronic entertainment in children's lives.
- Questioning the misuse of standardized high-stakes testing in education.
- Working with other groups, especially the Campaign for a Commercial-Free Childhood, to end marketing to children.
- Raising public awareness of the childhood obesity problem.
- Promoting education for peace.

== Publication ==
The Alliance's reports and position statements have inspired hundreds of news reports. The publication of Fool's Gold: A Critical Look at Computers in Childhood in 2000 ignited a national conversation about technology and children, as reported in The New York Times by Katie Hafner. A follow-up report, Tech Tonic: Towards a New Literacy of Technology, was published by the Alliance in 2004.

In March 2009 the Alliance published Crisis in the Kindergarten: Why Children Need to Play in School, written by Edward Miller and Joan Almon, two founders of the organization. Its findings—that children in all-day public kindergartens in New York and Los Angeles were spending most of their time being instructed and tested on literacy and math, with almost no time for free play—provoked a flurry of reactions, including a column by Peggy Orenstein in The New York Times Magazine.
