= Max Bruinsma =

Dutch design critic

Max Bruinsma (born 1956) is a Dutch design critic, editor, curator, and educator.

== Career ==
After studying Art and Design History in Groningen and Amsterdam, Bruinsma worked as editor-in-chief of the Dutch design magazine Items from 1988 to 1989, and Senior editor from 1992 to 1997. He then was Editor of Eye, a London-based international graphic design quarterly, from 1997 to 1999. He returned as Editor-in-Chief and Publisher of Items from 2009 to 2013. Bruinsma has contributed to many other art and design publications including ID, Blueprint, The AIGA Journal, Étappes, Form, Mediamatic and Metropolis M, published the book Deep Sites – Intelligent Innovation in Contemporary Webdesign with Thames & Hudson in 2003 and has been the Editor of several books.

The Pierre Bayle Prize for design criticism was awarded to Bruinsma in 2005.

He was curator of many exhibitions, among which "Catalysts! The cultural force of communication design" as part of Lisbon design biennial "ExperimentaDesign 2005" and "Useless?" for "ExperimentaDesign 2011" (co-curated with Hans Maier-Aichen). Between 2005 and 2013 he also was a member of ExperimentaDesign's international editorial advisory board.

Bruinsma worked as a lecturer and Visiting Professor at schools world-wide. In 2005, he co-founded the Master's course Editorial Design at the Graduate School of Art and Design, HKU Utrecht School of the Arts. From 2013 to 2015 he was course director of this course. He was Core Tutor at the Graphic design Masters program at St. Joost Academy of the Arts (2010–14) and a Core Tutor and Thesis Advisor for MIARD (Masters Interior Architecture - Research and Design) at the Piet Zwart Institute in Rotterdam (2013–19). He was Core Tutor Transmedia Narratives at Camera Arts, at the Lucerne School of Art and Design (2015–21). Since 2017 he is also editor of the yearly video portraits of NOMIS Distinguished Scientist Awards, Zürich, Switzerland.

== Bibliography ==
- Ricks, Jim, with Max Bruinsma. Alien Invader Super Baby (Synchromaterialism VI). Eindhoven: Onomatopee, 2018. ISBN 9789491677755
- Bruinsma, Max (Editor, Author), Margolin, Victor (Author), Brillembourg, Alfredo (author), Fuad-Luke, Alastair (author), Julier, Guy (author), Clarke, Alison (author), Weelden, Willem van (author). Design for the Good Society: Utrecht Manifest 2005-2015 Nai010 publishers, 2015. ISBN 9789462082052
- Annink, Ed and Max Bruinsma (Editors). Gerd Arntz: Graphic Designer. Nai010 publishers, 2013. ISBN 9789064507632
- Annink, Ed and Max Bruinsma (Editors). Lovely Language Paperback. Idea Books Ltd., 2011. ISBN 9789086901272
- Bruinsma, Max (Author). Deep Sites: Intelligent Innovation in Contemporary Webdesign. Thames & Hudson, 2003. ISBN 9780500283844
- Bruinsma, Max (Editor, Author), Schröder, Rob (Author), Ros, Lies (Author). Beeld tegen beeld. De Balie, 1994. ISBN 9066171197
- Bruinsma, Max (Author). Een Leest Heeft Drie Voeten, Dick Elffers en de Kunsten. GJ ThiemeFonds / De Balie, 1990. ISBN 9789066170629
- Bruinsma, Max (Editor). The Other Side of Design. Gerrit Rietveld Academie / De Balie, 1988. ISBN 9066170484
