= Studio Dumbar =

Dutch graphic design agency

Studio Dumbar is a Dutch graphic design agency founded in 1977 by Gert Dumbar.

== History ==
Studio Dumbar was founded by Gert Dumbar in 1977, in The Hague. In 2003, the studio moved to Rotterdam, as Michel de Boer took over the creative direction, after Gert Dumbar's retirement. In 2011 Liza Enebeis became the studio's third creative director. The studio was acquired by Dept, a digital marketing firm, in 2016.

== Projects ==
In 1993, Studio Dumbar designed the brand identity and liveries for Dutch National Police. The company also developed liveries for Dutch national rail company and the 2019 tourist logotype of the Netherlands. Seoul office of Studio Dumbar redesigned Korean National road signage in 2011.

== Philosophy and influence ==
Studio Dumbar describes itself as “an international design agency specialised in visual branding and online branding”.

Fragmented, sometimes complex to the edge of chaos, and layered with complex typography, many Dumbar projects in the early 1980s caused consternation among advocates of a more ordered aesthetic. By the late 1980s, many European designers were mimicking Studio Dumbar's approach, causing Gert Dumbar to place a moratorium on these techniques within his firm.

== Awards ==
- European Design Awards - Agency of the year 2023
- Communication Arts Typography Competition - Award of Excellence 2019
- The Webby Awards - Honoree 2018
- Communication Arts Design Competition - Award of Excellence 2016
- European Design Awards - Best of Show 2013
- Red Dot - Best of best 2011
- Red Dot - Grand Prix 2006
- Nederlandse Designprijzen - Grand Prix 2006
- D&AD - Gold 1982, 1987
