= Avi Ezri =

Avi Ezri may refer to one of the following books:

- Rabbi Elazar Shach's commentary on Mishneh Torah
- A book written by Rabbi Eliezer ben Joel HaLevi
