= Ken Garland =

British graphic designer (1929–2021)

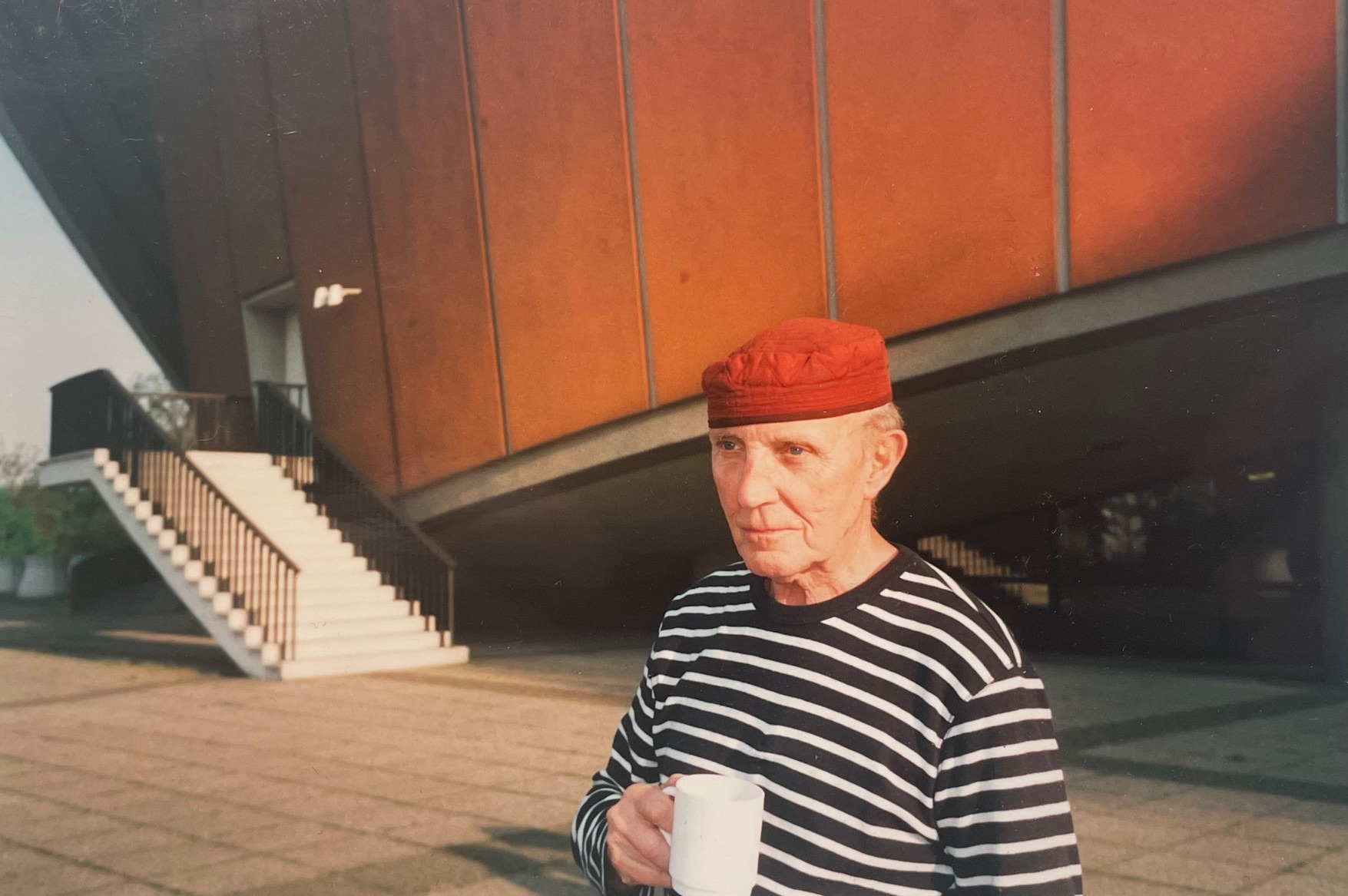
- Born: 19 February 1929; Southampton, England
- Died: 20 May 2021 (aged 92)
- Occupations: Graphic designer, photographer, writer
- Notable work: First Things First

Ken Garland (19 February 1929 – 20 May 2021) was a British graphic designer, photographer, writer and educator. Garland is known for his writing on design and the prolific work of his studio Ken Garland & Associates.

== Early life and education ==
Garland was born in Southampton, and he grew up in Barnstaple, north Devon. In 1945, he enrolled at the Royal West of England Academy in Bristol and served in the Parachute Regiment after graduation where he was sent to Lübeck, Germany in 1948. He later studied design at London's Central School of Arts and Crafts, graduating in 1954. His classmates included Derek Birdsall, Alan Fletcher, Colin Forbes, Peter Wildbur and Philip Thompson. That same year, he married Wanda Wistrich.

== Career ==
After graduation, Garland became the art editor of Furnishings magazine. In 1956, he became art editor of Design magazine, the trade journal of the Society of Industrial Arts, until 1962. This period was a foundational for Garland's future work and was commissioned to go to Switzerland to survey Swiss graphic design. In 1962, he left Design to form his own studio, Ken Garland & Associates.

Garland was politically active throughout his career, notably as a member of the Campaign for Nuclear Disarmament. Garland produced material for the CND from 1962–68. It was during this time that he redrew the peace sign to the simplified, bold graphic widely used today.

Garland taught throughout his career at the Central School of Art and Design (1986–91), University of Reading (1971-99), Royal College of Art (1977–87) and University of Brighton, among other institutions.

Garland was a prolific writer. His work has been published in Baseline, Blueprint, Creative Review and Eye magazine. He is the author of five books on design, including Graphics Handbook (1966), Illustrated Graphics Glossary (1980), Mr Beck's Underground map (1994) and A word in your eye (1996).

In 2008, Garland founded Pudkin Books with his wife, artist Wanda Garland (Wistrich). Pudkin is known for a series of picture books each on the theme of "A Close Look at..." a particular subject, from pebbles and street graphics to Mexican windows.

He died on 20 May 2021, of cancer.

== Garland & Associates ==
Garland established Ken Garland & Associates in 1962.

Ken Garland & Associates employed a rotating group of designers over its 47-year period including Robert Chapman, Ray Carpenter, Trilokesh Mukherjee, Gill Scott, Patrick Gould, John O'Neil, Norman Moore, Frank Hart, Daria Gan, Colin Bailey, Peter Cole, Ian Moore, Paul Cleal, Richard Marston and Anna Carson. Garland insisted that work made at the studio was a team effort.

The studio's clients included Galt Toys, Abbatt Toys, Race Furniture, the Butterley Group, Dancer & Hearne, the Campaign for Nuclear Disarmament, Barbour Index, the Labour Party, Paramount Pictures and the Ministry of Technology and Keniston Housing Association.

== First Things First manifesto ==
Garland's most famous piece of writing about the ethics of graphic design is the First Things First manifesto, published in 1964. This text argued for a return to humanist design, positioned against mainstream advertising: "in favour of the more useful and more lasting forms of communication". Garland recalled first scribbling it down during a meeting of the Society of Industrial Arts: "I found I wasn't so much reading it as declaiming it ... it had become ... that totally unfashionable device, a Manifesto."

...we have reached a saturation point at which the high pitched scream of consumer selling is no more than sheer noise. We think that there are other things more worth using our skill and experience on. There are signs for streets and buildings, books and periodicals, catalogues, instructional manuals, industrial photography, educational aids, films, television features, scientific and industrial publications and all the other media through which we promote our trade, our education, our culture and our greater awareness of the world. ...

— Ken Garland, First Things First, 1964.

The manifesto was signed by other designers including Edward Wright, Anthony Froshaug, Robin Fior and Ken Briggs. The text was widely circulated, reprinted several times in design journals and even The Guardian.

In 1999, the manifesto was re-signed by 23 prominent graphic designers and critics, and republished as the First Things First 2000 manifesto. It appeared in Adbusters magazine. Both manifestos have been widely written about and republished. In 2012, Garland published "Last Things Last" in Eye no. 83, vol. 21, which, among other things, refuted the division between designers and clients, of "us and them", in favour of designer / client partnerships.
