= Ezri Tarazi =

Israeli industrial designer (born 1962)

- עזרי טרזי
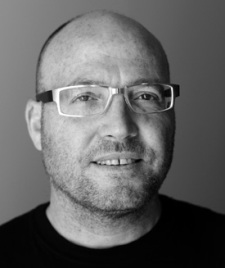
- Born: 1962; Jerusalem, Israel
- Education: Bezalel Academy of Art and Design

Prof. Ezri Tarazi (Hebrew: עזרי טרזי; born 1962, in Ezra Tarazi, Jerusalem) Israeli industrial designer and educator (1986–90). Tarazi studied industrial design at the Bezalel Academy of Art and Design in Jerusalem. Subsequently, he was a coordinator of instructors' education for leadership in the Maritime Academy of the Israeli Navy. Early employment included serving as the project manager of industrial-design projects at Bezalel R&D in Jerusalem in 1990–96, and was active as a freelance designer in 1993–96. 1996–2004, he was the head of the Department of Industrial Design at the Bezalel Academy and, 2004–12, founded and chaired the Bezalel master's-degree program in industrial design.

Tarazi has been active as a professional designer for a number of clients who produce a range of high-tech and office equipment and devices and, on an experimental level, for domestic goods. 1998–2000, he was a partner of IDEO Israel (an affiliate of IDEO California), now disbanded. In 2006–12, he was director of d-Vision, the design studio in Israel, where Keter Plastic products are designed. From 1992 and for over a decade, Tarazi has written on design issues for a number of publications, including for Haaretz newspaper in Tel Aviv. His best-known work is the 2005 "New Baghdad" table produced by Edra of Milan, Italy.

Established in 1996, the Tarazi Design Studio is located in Tel Aviv.
