= First Things First 1964 manifesto =

The First Things First manifesto was written 29 November 1963 and published in 1964 by Ken Garland. It was backed by over 400 graphic designers and artists and also received the backing of Tony Benn, radical left-wing MP and activist, who published it in its entirety in The Guardian newspaper.

Reacting against a rich and affluent Britain of the 1960s, it tried to re-radicalize a design industry which the signatories felt had become lazy and uncritical. Drawing on ideas shared by critical theory, the Frankfurt School, and the counter-culture of the time, it explicitly reaffirmed the belief that design is not a neutral, value-free process.

It rallied against the consumerist culture that was purely concerned with buying and selling things and tried to highlight a Humanist dimension to graphic design theory. It was later updated and republished with a new group of signatories as the First Things First 2000 manifesto.
