= Galt Toys =

- Company type: Public
- Industry: Toys
- Founded: 1961; 65 years ago
- Headquarters: Cheadle, Greater Manchester, UK
- Products: Educational toys
- Website: http://www.galttoys.com

Galt Toys is an international educational toy company. It is responsible for a number of high-profile games and its designs by Ken Garland are often cited as classics.

== History ==
=== Galt Educational ===
In 1836, Ayrshire-born, James Galt set up James Galt & Co. Ltd, which traded in Manchester as educational stockists. While the original product line consisted of items like desks and blackboards, the company expanded into publishing and printing, and increased its influence on the education sector. In 1957, the company moved its headquarters to Cheadle in Cheshire.

=== Galt Toys ===
In 1961, the Galt Toys Division was formed and opened its first toy shop on Carnaby Street, London. In addition to toys, the company's memorable items in recent events have included Royal Wedding knitting patterns.

=== Ken Garland ===
In 1961, the company approached Ken Garland and Associates (KGA) to act as design associates. Garland was tasked with building an image for the company from scratch. He also inadvertently changed the name of the company to Galt Toys. He also began designing toys for Galt, creating everything from wooden toys to board games.

In a twenty-year association with KGA, Galt Toys managed to produce some of the most iconic toys of the era, including Connect and Anymals.

=== Miriam Stoppard ===
Galt Toys has also worked with agony aunt and parenting specialist Miriam Stoppard on a selection of educational toys. There are 21 developmental toys in total, all aimed at encouraging younger children to learn and develop through play.

=== Merger with Jumbodiset ===
In 2019, Dutch toy company Jumbodiset merged with Galt Toys to build and strengthen both companies.

=== Research ===
Galt has been involved in studies into the amount of screen time children are exposed to during the summer holidays and how there has been a fall in the use of a child’s imagination and how a lack of playtime with parents is affecting children.
