= Graphic design =

Interdisciplinary branch of design and fine arts

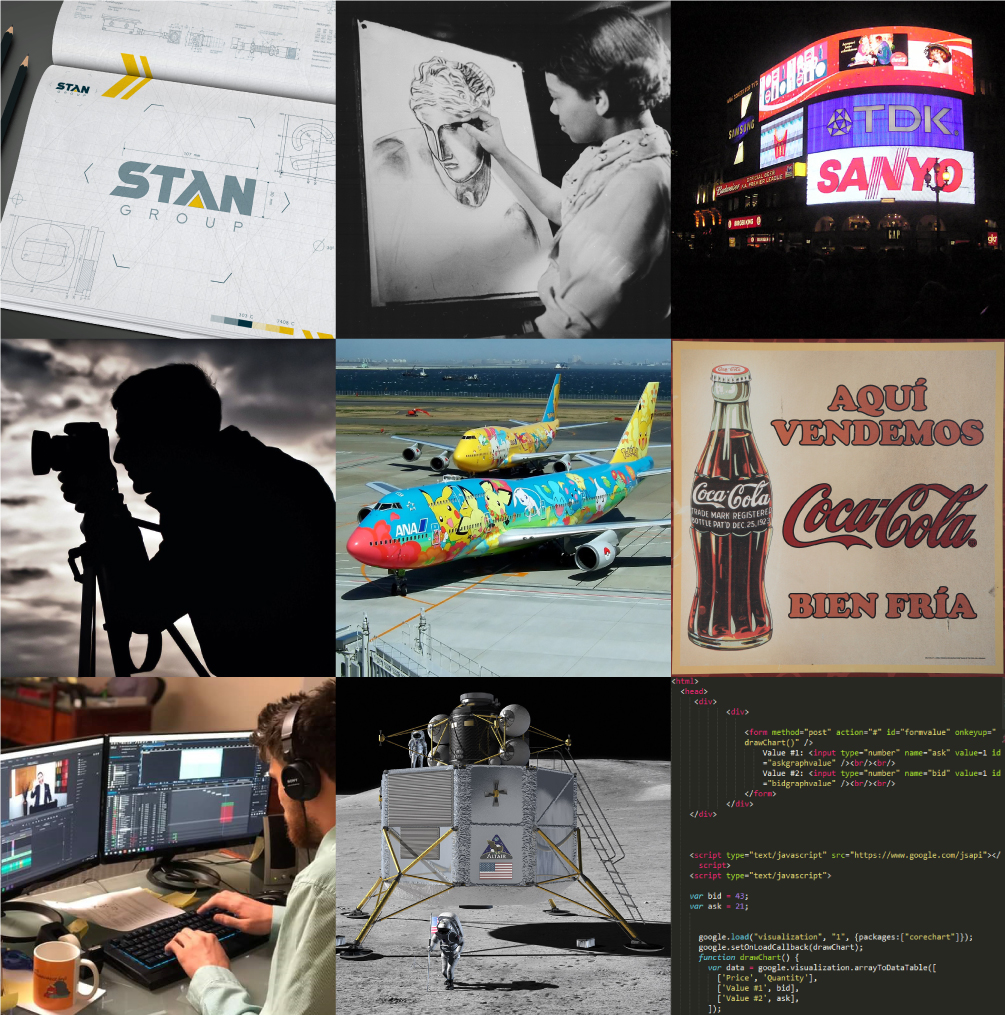
Due to its interdisciplinary nature, graphic design can be performed in different areas of application: branding, technical and artistic drawing, signage, photography, image and video editing, 3D modeling, animation, programming, digital drawing, video creation among other fields.

Graphic design is a profession, academic discipline and applied art that involves creating visual communications intended to transmit specific messages to social groups, with specific objectives. Graphic design is an interdisciplinary branch of design and of the fine arts. Its practice involves creativity, innovation and lateral thinking using manual or digital tools, where it is usual to use text and graphics to communicate visually.

The role of the graphic designer in the communication process is that of the encoder or interpreter of the message. They work on the interpretation, ordering, and presentation of visual messages. In its nature, design pieces can be philosophical, aesthetic, emotional and political. Usually, graphic design uses the aesthetics of typography and the compositional arrangement of the text, ornamentation, and imagery to convey ideas, feelings, and attitudes beyond what language alone expresses. The design work can be based on a customer's demand, a demand that is established linguistically, either orally or in writing; that is, graphic design transforms a linguistic message into a graphic manifestation.

Graphic design, as a field of application, encompasses different areas of knowledge focused on visual communication systems. For example, it can be applied in advertising strategies, or it can also be applied in the aviation world or space exploration. In this sense, in some countries graphic design is related as only associated with the production of sketches and drawings, this is incorrect, since visual communication is a small part of a huge range of types and classes where it can be applied.

With origins in Antiquity and the Middle Ages, graphic design as applied art was initially linked to the boom of the rise of printing in Europe in the 15th century and the growth of consumer culture in the Industrial Revolution. From there it emerged as a distinct profession in the West, closely associated with advertising in the 19th century and its evolution allowed its consolidation in the 20th century. Given the rapid and massive growth in information exchange today, the demand for experienced designers is greater than ever, particularly because of the development of new technologies and the need to pay attention to human factors beyond the competence of the engineers who develop them.

== Terminology ==
The term "graphic design" makes an early appearance in a 4 July 1908 issue (volume 9, number 27) of Organized Labor, a publication of the Labor Unions of San Francisco, in an article about technical education for printers:

An Enterprising Trades Union
… The admittedly high standard of intelligence that prevails among printers is an assurance that, with the elemental principles of design at their fingertips, many of them will grow in knowledge and develop into specialists in graphic design and decorating. …

A decade later, the 1917–1918 course catalog of the California School of Arts & Crafts advertised a course titled Graphic Design and Lettering, replacing the course titled Advanced Design and Lettering. Both classes were taught by Frederick Meyer.

== History ==
In both its lengthy history and in the relatively recent explosion of visual communication in the 20th and 21st centuries, the distinction between advertising, art, graphic design and fine art has disappeared. They share many elements, theories, principles, practices, languages and sometimes the same benefactor or client. In advertising, the ultimate objective is the sale of goods and services. In graphic design, "the essence is to give order to information, form to ideas, expression, and feeling to artifacts that document the human experience."

The definition of the graphic designer profession is relatively recent concerning its preparation, activity, and objectives. Although there is no consensus on an exact date for the emergence of graphic design, some date it back to the Interwar period. Others understand that it began to be identified as such by the late 19th century.

It can be argued that graphic communications with specific purposes have their origins in Paleolithic cave paintings and the birth of written language in the third millennium BCE. However, the differences in working methods, auxiliary sciences, and required training are such that it is not possible to clearly identify the current graphic designer with prehistoric man, the 15th-century xylographer, or the lithographer of 1890.

The diversity of opinions stems from some considering any graphic manifestation as a product of graphic design, while others only recognize those that arise as a result of the application of an industrial production model—visual manifestations that have been "projected" to address various needs: productive, symbolic, ergonomic, contextual, among others.

By the late 19th century, graphic design emerged as a distinct profession in the West, partly due to labor specialization there and to the new technologies and business opportunities brought about by the Industrial Revolution. New production methods led to the separation of the design of a communication medium (such as a poster) from its actual production. Increasingly, throughout the 19th and early 20th centuries, advertising agencies, book publishers, and magazines hired art directors who organized all visual elements of communication and integrated them into a harmonious whole, creating an expression appropriate to the content.

Throughout the 20th century, the technology available to designers continued to advance rapidly, as did the artistic and commercial possibilities of design. The profession expanded greatly, and graphic designers created, among other things, magazine pages, book covers, posters, CD covers, postage stamps, packaging, brands, signs, advertisements, kinetic titles for TV programs and movies, and websites. By the early 21st century, graphic design had become a global profession as advanced technology and industry spread worldwide.

=== Historical background ===
In China during the Tang dynasty (618–907), woodblocks were cut to print on textiles and later to reproduce Buddhist texts. A Buddhist scripture printed in 868 is the earliest known printed book. Beginning in the 11th century in China, longer scrolls and books were produced using movable type printing, making books widely available during the Song dynasty (960–1279).

In Mesopotamia, writing (as an extension of graphic design) began with commerce. The earliest writing system, cuneiform, began with basic pictograms representing houses, lambs, or grain.

In the mid-15th century in Mainz, Germany, Johannes Gutenberg developed a way to reproduce printed pages at a faster pace using movable type made with a new metal alloy that created a revolution in the dissemination of information.

=== Nineteenth century ===
In 1849, Henry Cole became one of the major forces in design education in Great Britain, informing the government of the importance of design in his Journal of Design and Manufactures. He organized the Great Exhibition as a celebration of modern industrial technology and Victorian design.

From 1891 to 1896, William Morris' Kelmscott Press was a leader in graphic design associated with the Arts and Crafts movement, creating hand-made books in medieval and Renaissance-era style, in addition to wallpaper and textile designs. Morris' work, along with the rest of the Private Press movement, directly influenced Art Nouveau.

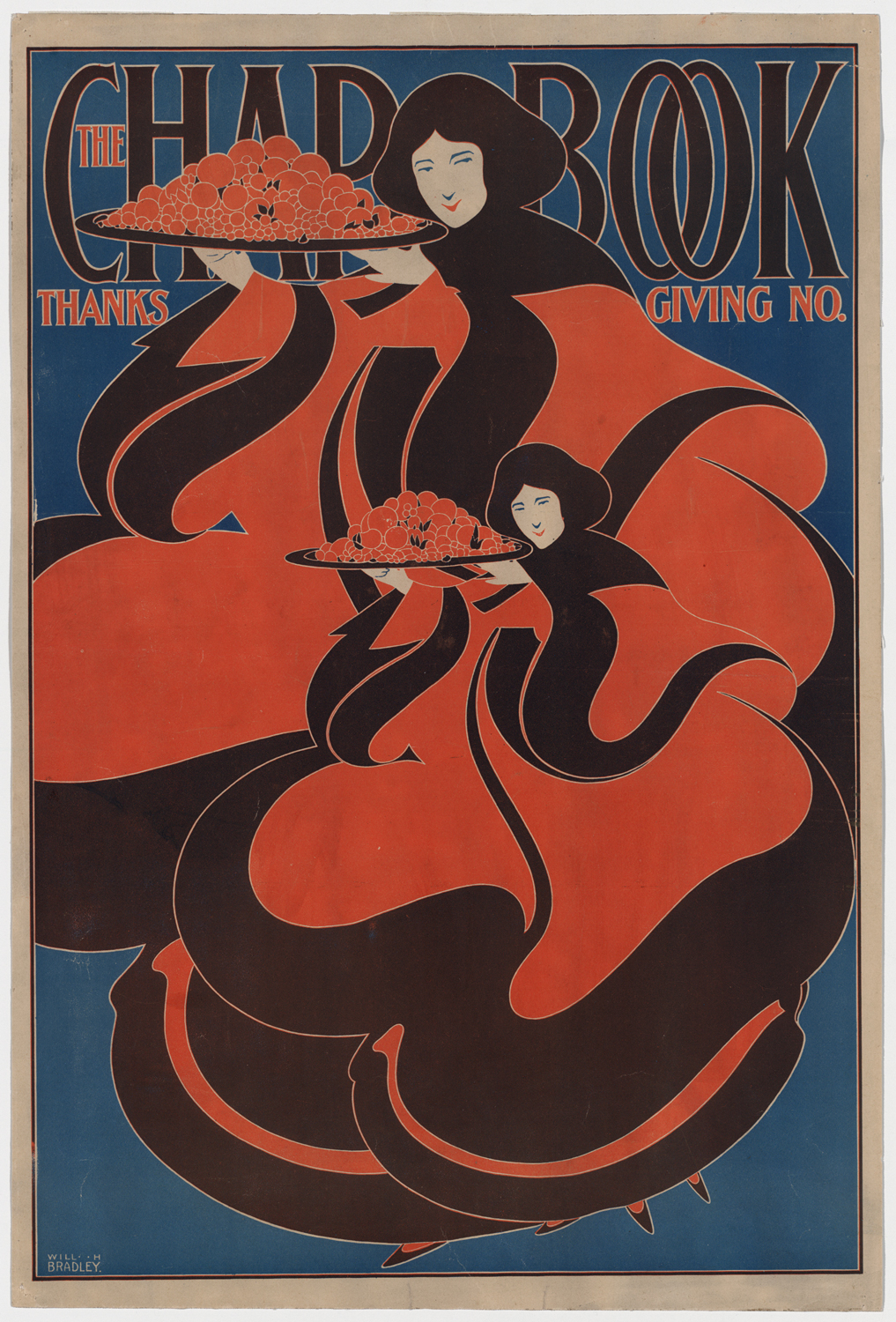
Cover of the Thanksgiving 1895 issue of The Chap-Book, designed by Will H. Bradley

Will H. Bradley was one of the notable graphic designers of the late nineteenth century for creating art pieces in various Art Nouveau styles. Bradley created a number of designs as promotions for a literary magazine titled The Chap-Book.

=== Twentieth century ===
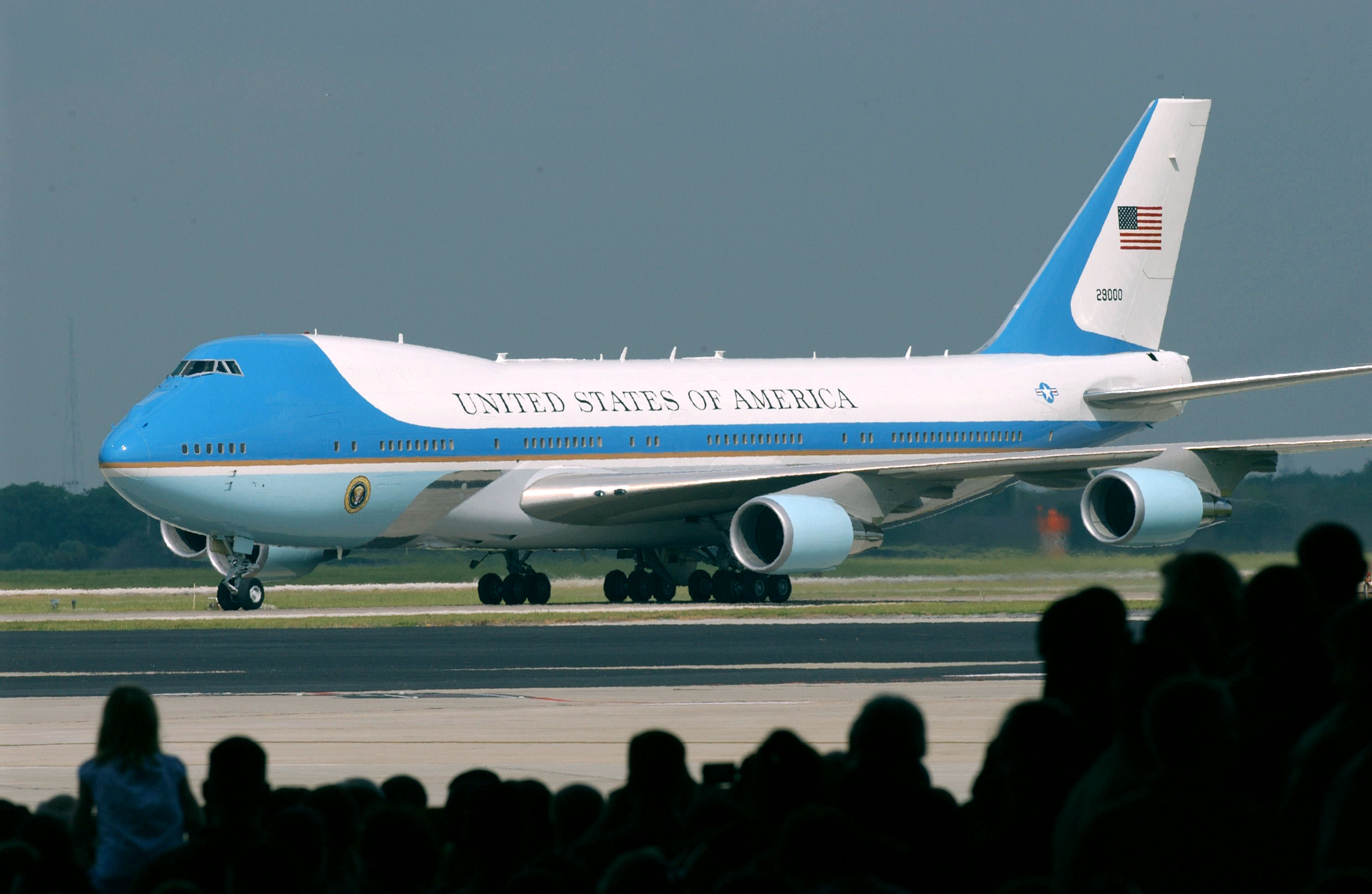
A Boeing 747 aircraft with livery designating it as Air Force One. The cyan forms, the US flag, presidential seal and the Caslon lettering, were all designed at different times, by different designers, for different purposes, and combined by designer Raymond Loewy in this one single aircraft exterior design.

In 1917, Frederick H. Meyer, director and instructor at the California School of Arts and Crafts, taught a class entitled "Graphic Design and Lettering". Raffe's Graphic Design, published in 1927, was the first book to use "Graphic Design" in its title. In 1936, author and graphic designer Leon Friend published his book titled "Graphic Design" and it is known to be the first piece of literature to cover the topic extensively.

The signage in the London Underground is a classic design example of the modern era. Although he lacked artistic training, Frank Pick led the Underground Group design and publicity movement. The first Underground station signs were introduced in 1908, featuring a solid red disk with a blue bar in the center and the station name. The station name was in white sans-serif letters. In 1916, Pick enlisted the expertise of Edward Johnston to design a new typeface for the Underground. Johnston redesigned the Underground sign and logo, placing his typeface on the blue bar in the center of a red circle.

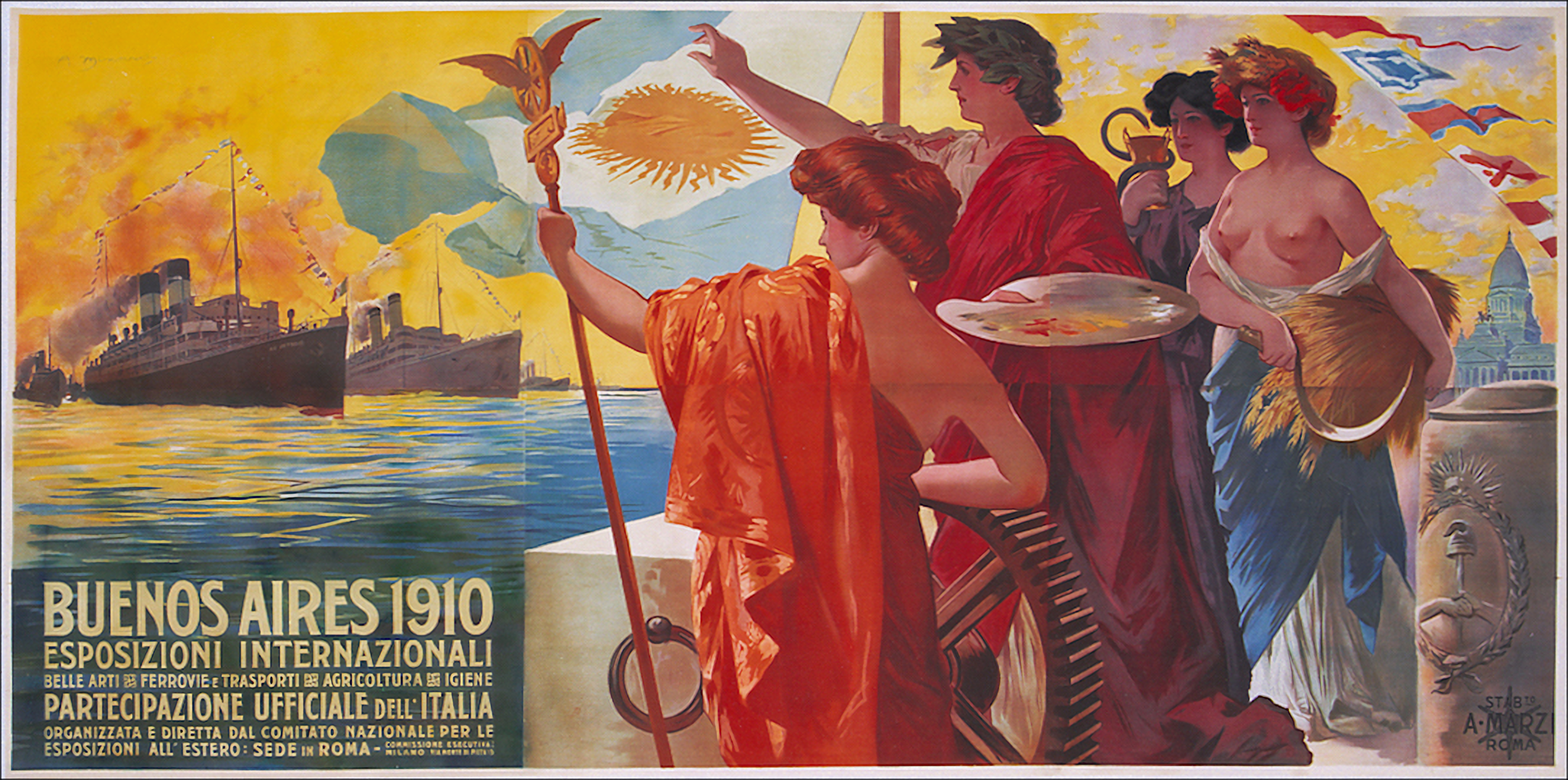
Poster to promote the Centennial of Argentina (1910)

In the 1920s, Soviet constructivism applied 'intellectual production' in different spheres of production. The movement saw individualistic art as useless in revolutionary Russia and thus moved towards creating objects for utilitarian purposes. They designed buildings, film and theater sets, posters, fabrics, clothing, furniture, logos, menus, etc.

Jan Tschichold codified the principles of modern typography in his 1928 book, New Typography. He later repudiated the philosophy he espoused in this book as fascistic, but it remained influential. Tschichold, Bauhaus typographers such as Herbert Bayer and László Moholy-Nagy and El Lissitzky greatly influenced graphic design. They pioneered production techniques and stylistic devices used throughout the twentieth century. The following years saw graphic design in the modern style gain widespread acceptance and application.

The professional graphic design industry grew in parallel with consumerism. This raised concerns and criticisms, notably from within the graphic design community with the First Things First manifesto. First launched by Ken Garland in 1964, it was re-published as the First Things First 2000 manifesto in 1999 in the magazine Emigre 51 stating "We propose a reversal of priorities in favor of more useful, lasting and democratic forms of communication – a mindshift away from product marketing and toward the exploration and production of a new kind of meaning. The scope of debate is shrinking; it must expand. Consumerism is running uncontested; it must be challenged by other perspectives expressed, in part, through the visual languages and resources of design."

== Applications ==
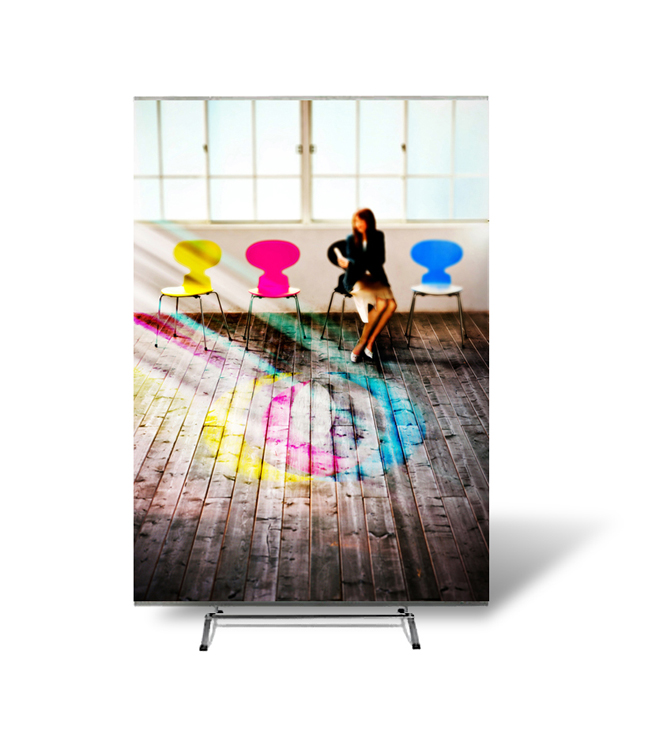
Colour

Graphic design can have many applications, from road signs to technical schematics and reference manuals. It is often used in branding products and elements of company identity such as logos, colors, packaging, labelling and text.

From scientific journals to news reporting, the presentation of opinions and facts is often improved with graphics and thoughtful compositions of visual information – known as information design. With the advent of the web, information designers with experience in interactive tools are increasingly used to illustrate the background to news stories. Information design can include Data and information visualization, which involves using programs to interpret and present data in a visually compelling way, and can be tied to information graphics.

== Skills ==
A graphic design project may involve the creative presentation of existing text, ornament, and images.

The "process school" is concerned with communication; it highlights the channels and media through which messages are transmitted and the ways senders and receivers encode and decode them. The semiotic school treats a message as a construction of signs which, through interaction with receivers, produces meaning; communication as an agent.

=== Typography ===
Typography includes type design, modifying type glyphs and arranging type. Type glyphs (characters) are created and modified using illustration techniques. Type arrangement is the selection of typefaces, point size, tracking (the space between all characters used), kerning (the space between two specific characters) and leading (line spacing). In typography fonts of different size can be easily made in such a way that the font smaller from the largest font size will be 1.618 times small, i.e., divide the larger size with 1.618 to make the size smaller.

Typography is performed by typesetters, compositors, typographers, graphic artists, art directors, and clerical workers. Until the digital age, typography was a specialized occupation. Certain fonts communicate or resemble stereotypical notions. For example, the 1942 Report is a font that types text akin to a typewriter or a vintage report.

=== Page layout ===
Golden section in book design

Page layout deals with the arrangement of elements (content) on a page, such as image placement, text layout and style. Page design has always been a consideration in printed materials and, more recently, has been extended to displays such as web pages. Elements typically consist of type (text), images (pictures), and (with print media) occasionally place-holder graphics such as a dieline for elements that are not printed with ink such as die/laser cutting, foil stamping or blind embossing.

=== Grids ===
A grid serves as a method of arranging both space and information, allowing the reader to easily comprehend the overall project. Furthermore, a grid functions as a container for information and a means of establishing and maintaining order. Despite grids being utilized for centuries, many graphic designers associate them with Swiss design. The desire for order in the 1940s resulted in a highly systematic approach to visualizing information. However, grids were later regarded as tedious and uninteresting, earning the label of "designersaur." Today, grids are once again considered crucial tools for professionals, whether they are novices or veterans.

== Tools ==
In the mid-1980s, desktop publishing and graphic art software introduced digital tools for image manipulation and creation, replacing many processes that were previously done by hand. Computers enabled designers to instantly see the effects of layout or typographic changes, and to simulate the effects of traditional media. Traditional tools such as pencils can be useful even when computers are used for finalization; a designer or art director may sketch numerous concepts as part of the creative process. Styluses can be used with tablet computers to capture hand drawings digitally.

=== Computers and software ===
Designers disagree whether computers enhance the creative process. Some designers argue that computers allow them to explore multiple ideas quickly and in more detail than can be achieved by hand-rendering or paste-up. While other designers find the limitless choices from digital design can lead to paralysis or endless iterations with no clear outcome.

Most designers use a hybrid process that combines traditional and computer-based technologies. First, hand-rendered layouts are used to get approval to execute an idea, then the polished visual product is produced on a computer.

Graphic designers are expected to be proficient in software programs for image-making, typography and layout. Nearly all of the popular and "industry standard" software programs used by graphic designers since the early 1990s are products of Adobe Inc. Adobe Photoshop (a raster-based program for photo editing) and Adobe Illustrator (a vector-based program for drawing) are often used in the final stage. CorelDraw, a vector graphics editing software developed and marketed by Corel Corporation, is also used worldwide. Designers often use pre-designed raster images and vector graphics in their work from online design databases. Raster images may be edited in Adobe Photoshop, vector logos and illustrations in Adobe Illustrator and CorelDraw, and the final product assembled in one of the major page layout programs, such as Adobe InDesign, Serif PagePlus and QuarkXPress.

Many free and open-source programs are also used by both professionals and casual graphic designers. Inkscape uses Scalable Vector Graphics (SVG) as its primary file format and allows importing and exporting other formats. Other open-source programs used include GIMP for photo-editing and image manipulation, krita for digital painting, and scribus for page layout.

== Related design fields ==
=== Print design ===
A specialized branch of graphic design and historically its earliest form, print design involves creating visual content intended for reproduction on physical substrates such as silk, paper, and later, plastic, for mass communication and persuasion (e.g., marketing, governmental publishing, propaganda). Print design techniques have evolved over centuries, beginning with the invention of movable type by the Chinese alchemist Pi Sheng, later refined by the German inventor Johannes Gutenberg. Over time, methods such as lithography, screen printing, and offset printing have been developed, culminating in the contemporary use of digital presses that integrate traditional print techniques with modern digital technology.

=== Interface design ===
Since the advent of personal computers, many graphic designers have become involved in interface design, in an environment commonly referred to as a Graphical user interface (GUI). This has included web design and software design when end user-interactivity is a design consideration of the layout or interface. Combining visual communication skills with an understanding of user interaction and online branding, graphic designers often work with software developers and web developers to create the look and feel of a web site or software application. An important aspect of interface design is icon design.

=== User experience design ===
User experience design (UX) is the study, analysis, and development of creating products that provide meaningful and relevant experiences to users. This involves the creation of the entire process of acquiring and integrating the product, including aspects of branding, design, usability, and function. UX design involves creating the interface and interactions for a website or application, and is considered both an act and an art. This profession requires a combination of skills, including visual design, social psychology, development, project management, and most importantly, empathy towards the end-users.

=== Experiential (environmental) graphic design ===
Experiential graphic design is the application of communication skills to the built environment. It is also known as environmental graphic design (EGD) or environmental graphics. This area of graphic design requires practitioners to understand physical installations that have to be manufactured and withstand the same environmental conditions as buildings. As such, it is a cross-disciplinary collaborative process involving designers, fabricators, city planners, architects, manufacturers and construction teams.

Experiential graphic designers try to solve problems that people encounter while interacting with buildings and space (also called environmental graphic design). Examples of practice areas for environmental graphic designers are wayfinding, placemaking, branded environments, exhibitions and museum displays, public installations and digital environments.

== Occupations ==
Graphic symbols are often functionalist and anonymous, as these pictographs from the US National Park Service illustrate.

Graphic design career paths cover all parts of the creative spectrum and often overlap. Workers perform specialized tasks, such as design services, publishing, advertising and public relations. As of 2023, median pay was $58,910 per year. The main job titles within the industry are often country-specific. They can include graphic designer, art director, creative director, animator, and entry-level production artist. Depending on the industry served, the responsibilities may have different titles such as "DTP associate" or "Graphic Artist". The responsibilities may involve specialized skills such as illustration, photography, animation, visual effects or interactive design.

Employment in design of online projects was expected to increase by 35% by 2026, while employment in traditional media, such as newspaper and book design, expect to go down by 22%. Graphic designers will be expected to constantly learn new techniques, programs, and methods.

Graphic designers can work within companies devoted specifically to the industry, such as design consultancies or branding agencies, others may work within publishing, marketing or other communications companies. Especially since the introduction of personal computers, many graphic designers work as in-house designers in non-design oriented organizations. Graphic designers may also work freelance, working on their own terms, prices, ideas, etc.

A graphic designer typically reports to the art director, creative director or senior media creative. As a designer becomes more senior, they spend less time designing and more time leading and directing other designers on broader creative activities, such as brand development and corporate identity development. They are often expected to interact more directly with clients, for example taking and interpreting briefs.

=== Crowdsourcing ===
Jeff Howe of Wired Magazine first used the term "crowdsourcing" in his 2006 article, "The Rise of Crowdsourcing." It spans such creative domains as graphic design, architecture, apparel design, writing, illustration, and others. Tasks may be assigned to individuals or a group and may be categorized as convergent or divergent. An example of a divergent task is generating alternative designs for a poster. An example of a convergent task is selecting one poster design. Companies, startups, small businesses and entrepreneurs have all benefitted from design crowdsourcing since it helps them source great graphic designs at a fraction of the budget they used to spend before. Getting a logo design through crowdsourcing being one of the most common. Major companies that operate in the design crowdsourcing space are generally referred to as design contest sites.

== Role ==
Graphic design influences consumer behavior through the use of visual elements such as color, typography, and imagery. Studies have shown that certain colors can evoke specific emotions and behaviors in consumers, and that typography can influence how information is perceived and remembered. For example, serif fonts are often associated with tradition and elegance, while sans-serif fonts are seen as modern and minimalistic. These factors can affect consumers' perceptions of brands and their messaging. Graphic design also affects consumer behavior by communicating complex information in clear, accessible ways. For example, infographics and data visualizations can help distill complex information into understandable and engaging formats for consumers.

== Future ==
=== AI and automation ===
Advancements in areas such as artificial intelligence, virtual and augmented reality, and automation are likely to transform the way that graphic designers work and create designs. Social trends, such as a greater focus on sustainability and inclusivity, are likely to impact the future of graphic design.

Easily-accessible computer software using AI algorithms will complete many practical tasks performed by graphic designers, allowing clients to bypass human designers altogether. For example, machine learning algorithms can analyze large datasets and create designs based on patterns and trends, freeing up designers to focus on more complex and creative tasks. Virtual and augmented reality technologies may allow designers to create immersive and interactive experiences for users. Artificial intelligence has led to many challenges, including the maintenance of brand authenticity, quality assurance, issues of bias, and the preservation of creative control.

Visual communication design education is ill-prepared for automation, artificial intelligence and machine learning.

As consumers become more conscious of environmental issues, there may be a greater demand for designs that prioritize sustainability and minimize waste. Similarly, there is likely to be a growing focus on inclusivity and diversity in design, with designers seeking to create designs that are accessible and representative of broader varieties of individuals and communities.

== See also ==
=== Related areas ===
- Concept art
- Copywriting
- Digital illustration
- Illustration
- Instructional design
- Landscape architecture
- Marketing communications
- Motion graphic design
- New media
- Technical illustration
- Technical writing
- User Experience Design
- User Interface Design
- Visual communication
- Communication design
- Visual culture
- Visual design

=== Related topics ===
- Aesthetics
- Color theory
- Design principles and elements
- European Design Award
- "First Things First 2000"
- Infographic
- List of graphic design institutions
- List of notable graphic designers
- Logotype
- Material culture
- Style guide
- Value
- Visualization (computer graphics)
- International Typographic Style
- Swiss Style (design)

== Bibliography ==
- Fiell, Charlotte and Fiell, Peter (editors). Contemporary Graphic Design. Taschen Publishers, 2008. ISBN 978-3-8228-5269-9
- Wiedemann, Julius and Taborda, Felipe (editors). Latin-American Graphic Design. Taschen Publishers, 2008. ISBN 978-3-8228-4035-1
