= European Design Awards =

Annual awards presented to designers

- Native name: ED-Awards
- Description: Celebrating outstanding work in communication design
- Country: Europe (Host city varies)
- Presented by: Joint initiative of European design magazines

The European Design Awards, also known as the ED-Awards, are annual awards presented to European designers for outstanding work in the communication design field. The ED-Awards is a joint initiative of design magazines from across Europe and endorsed by the International Council of Design. The ED-Awards are judged by a panel of representatives (journalists and design critics) from fifteen European design magazines, while the winning submissions are featured in the ED-Awards Catalogue.

== Model ==
The ED-Awards is different from other design awards schemes in that the jury is not made up of designers, but of design journalists and critics – people who see and judge work for a living. Furthermore, since the ED-Awards organisation is made up of design magazines, it provides an opportunity for everyone submitting work, to have it featured in a number of these media. A lot of stories and articles are created through the submitted work every year.

== Jury ==
Originally, the ED-Awards jury was composed exclusively of journalists from leading graphic design magazines across Europe, including Germany's Novum (Zeitschrift), UK's Eye, and France's étapes:, among others. However, in recent years, the ED-Awards has broadened its jury composition to incorporate a more diverse range of expertise within the communication design field. This evolution reflects a strategic decision to include not only journalists but also critics, curators, academics, and content creators (always linked with the realm of communication design)

== Categories ==
There are 47 award categories, in nine groups, covering branding, packaging, exhibition design, typography, digital design, illustration and self-promotion, among others. There are also three special distinctions: Agency of the year, Best of show and Jury prize.

== European Design Agency of the year ==
The top accolade in the ED-Awards is every time, the distinction bestowed upon the most (creatively) successful studio of the continent. This title has so far been awarded to:

- 2008 Beetroot Design Group, Greece
- 2010 Lava Design, the Netherlands
- 2011 Les Graphiquants, France
- 2012 Silo, the Netherlands
- 2013 Jaeger & Jaeger, Germany
- 2014 R2, Portugal
- 2015 Ermolaev Bureau, Russia
- 2016 Raffinerie AG für Gestaltung, Switzerland
- 2017 Silo, the Netherlands
- 2018 Vruchtvlees, the Netherlands
- 2019 Kind, Norway
- 2020 ANTI, Norway
- 2021 WePlayDesign, Switzerland
- 2022 Verve, the Netherlands
- 2023 Studio Dumbar, the Netherlands
- 2024 Studio Airport, the Netherlands
- 2025 Clever°Franke, the Netherlands
- 2026 Dizain, the Netherlands

== Host cities ==
Each year’s results are announced during the European Design Awards Ceremony, which takes place as part of the European Design Festival hosted in a different European city each year. So far, the Festival and Awards Ceremony have been hosted by:

- Athens, Greece (2007)
- Stockholm, Sweden (2008)
- Zurich, Switzerland (2009)
- Rotterdam, the Netherlands (2010)
- Vilnius, Lithuania (2011)
- Helsinki, Finland (2012)
- Belgrade, Serbia (2013)
- Cologne, Germany (2014)
- Istanbul, Turkey (2015)
- Vienna, Austria (2016)
- Porto, Portugal (2017)
- Oslo, Norway (2018)
- Warsaw, Poland (2019)
- The 2020 and 2021 events that were scheduled to take place in Valencia, Spain had to be cancelled due to the COVID-19 pandemic
- Tallinn, Estonia (2022)
- Luxembourg city, Luxembourg (2023)
- Naples, Italy (2024)
- Ljubljana, Slovenia (2025)
- Sofia, Bulgaria (2026)

== Related links ==
- German Design Award
- Red Dot
- Communication Arts
