= GTF =

GTF may stand for:

== Companies and organizations ==
- Georgia Tech Foundation
- German Taekwondo Federation
- German Taxpayers Federation
- German Tennis Federation
- Global Tamil Forum
- Global Thinkers Forum, in London, England
- Graduate Theological Foundation, in Indiana
- Graphic Thought Facility, a British graphic design agency

== Computing ==
- Generalized Trace Facility, a facility in OS/360 and successors for logging events to a file.

== Science ==
- Gene transfer format, a file format
- General transcription factor, a class of protein transcription factors
- Glucose tolerance factor
- Glycosyltransferase
- Green tree frog (disambiguation)

== Technology ==
- Generalized Timing Formula, a video timings standard
- Geared turbofan
- Pratt & Whitney GTF, a turbofan engine

== Other ==
- Gallaher's Tobacco Factory
- Great Falls International Airport, in Montana
- Guam Telecommunications Facility
