= Jorge Pardo (artist) =

Cuban-American artist and sculptor (born 1963)

- Born: Cuba
- Education: University of Illinois at Chicago, Art Center College of Design
- Known for: Sculpture, Design, Architecture, Painting, installation art
- Awards: MacArthur Fellowship Award, Smithsonian American Art Museum Lucelia Artist Award, The Louis Comfort Tiffany Foundation Award

Jorge Pardo (born 1963, in Havana) is a Cuban-American artist and sculptor. Pardo's artwork explores the intersection of contemporary painting, design, sculpture, and architecture. In 2010, he was awarded a MacArthur Fellowship.

He lives and works in Mérida, Mexico.

== Life and career ==
Pardo was born in Havana but his family relocated to Chicago when he was six. His father worked at a staple factory and his mother was a bookkeeper. He attended the University of Illinois at Chicago, originally to study biology. After taking courses in painting recreationally he was encouraged to change direction by a teacher, and received his BFA from the Art Center College of Design in Pasadena, where he was a student of Stephen Prina and Mike Kelley.

== Works ==
Pardo's work has always dealt with the intersection of sculpture, architecture and construction. Regarding his work, Pardo has stated "What I do is shape space and play with history that forms people's sense of expectation."

At one of his earliest shows, at Los Angeles gallery Thomas Solomon's Garage (1990), Pardo exhibited handyman tools he had reworked.

4166 Sea View Lane (1998)

In 1993, Pardo proposed that he would build his own house as part of an exhibition for LA MoCA, blurring the lines between art and function; "a house that is also a sculpture". The single story, bent C-shaped redwood structure was completed in 1998, when it opened to the public as a temporary satellite space to MoCA. The house is situated on a steep hillside in Mount Washington, Los Angeles. Structurally, the house is windowless toward Sea View Lane but offers semicircular views of a lush interior garden as well as a view of the Pacific Ocean, weather-permitting, from the dining room. Pardo designed every element in the building - the lamps, furniture, tiles and garden landscaping.

Project (2000-2001)

Pardo was commissioned to create an art work for the Dia Art Foundation at 548 W 22nd Street in Chelsea, New York in 2000. His resulting work, Project, functioned in three ways: to redesign the museum lobby, to create a substantial bookshop, and to propose an exhibition for the first-floor gallery, a traditional white cube space. The installation included wardrobe furniture for a patient's room by designer Alvar Aalto, side tables by designer Marcel Breuer, high stools by designer Jasper Morrison, and a full-scale model of a 1994 Volkswagen New Beetle. Pardo preferred to work incrementally, improvising with an agreed-upon framework as the project progressed. The exhibition brochure states: "Eschewing finite edges, erasing borders both literal and metaphorical, Project problematizes the interface between art, architecture, and design."

Reyes House (2005)

In 2005, Pardo was commissioned to design a house for art collectors César and Mima Reyes in Naguabo, Puerto Rico. Fashioned after 4166 Sea View Lane, the house was designed to take advantage of the location by making the space open to the surrounding Caribbean views. Pardo incorporated concrete, bright orange metal screens, colorful tiling, and a kitchen collaboratively designed with the Reyes themselves. Reyes said of Pardo, "Jorge has an incredible sense of space. Some people have a perfect ear for music; he has perfect spatial intelligence."

Tecoh (2007)

Madrazo Tecoh Project saw Pardo renovate a ruined estate an hour out of Mérida, Mexico. The site was originally a farm and factory for manufacturing sisal twine, reaching its apex of productivity in the 1920s and '30s. The estate gradually went into disrepair in the postwar years, following the introduction of synthetic fibers. Pardo's refurbishment is founded on the history and aesthetic of the site, calling on local craftspeople for construction assistance. Like 4166 Sea View Lane, Pardo meticulously designed every aspect of the building's structure and interior elements. "Every element in Tecoh is laboriously thought over by being designed and redesigned, the formalism of the near-cubist angular surfaces further reinforcing not only the "irregular topography", but also the ongoing conversation so crucial to Pardo's work.". The catalogue for this project consisted of a book of photographs of the site, where Pardo superimposed glowing color fields.

== Exhibitions ==
Pardo is represented by neugerriemschneider in Berlin, Petzel Gallery in New York and Galerie Gisela Capitain in Cologne. His work has been exhibited at the Museum of Modern Art in New York and the Centre Pompidou in Paris. He has had solo exhibitions at Gagosian Gallery, the Irish Museum of Modern Art, K21 Kunstsammlung Nordrhein-Westfalen, the Los Angeles County Museum of Art and the Museum of Contemporary Art North Miami.

== Works & Commissions ==
- Pier, (1997), Skulptur Projekte Muenster, Münster, Germany
- Untitled (Sailboat) (1997), Museum of Contemporary Art, Chicago
- Lighthouse (1997), Museum Boijmans van Beuningen, Rotterdam, Netherlands
- 4166 Sea View Lane (1998), Los Angeles, California
- Project (2000-2001), Dia Art Foundation, New York
- Restaurant, Parliament (2002), Paul-Löbe-Haus, Berlin, Germany
- Flower Glasshouse, Flower Power (2002-2003), Palais des Beaux Arts, Lille, France
- Historic Turbine-Hall (2003), Stadtwerke Düsseldorf, Germany
- Project for Lever House (2003-2004), New York
- oliver, oliver, oliver, outdoor movie theatre (2004), Braunschweig Parcours, Germany
- Reyes House (2005), Naguabo, Puerto Rico
- Untitled (Pleasure Boat) (2005), Los Angeles
- Untitled (96 Butterfly Lamps) (2006-2007), Aventura Mall, Aventure, Florida
- Tecoh (2007), Tecoh Municipality, Mérida, Mexico
- Reinstallation of Los Angeles County Museum of Art's Latin American Galleries (2008)
- Cathedral de Burgos (2010), Burgos, Spain
- Provost Church St. Trinitas (2012-2015), Leipzig, Germany
- Streetcar Stop for Portland (2013), Portland
- Pardo Houses at Krabbesholm Højskole, Skive, Denmark
- Jorge Pardo et la sculpture romane, Musée des Augustins, Toulouse, France (2018)

== Literature ==
- Philippe Parreno, Barbara Steiner, et al., Jorge Pardo, Hatje Cantz, 2000.
- Miljohn Ruperto and Donelle Woolford, editors, 4166 Sea View Lane: a Reader, Commerce Books, 2003.
- Liam Gillick, Jorge Pardo, Haunch of Venison, London, 2003.
- Christina Végh, Jorge Pardo, Haunch of Venison, Zürich, 2005.
- Lane Relyea, Christina Végh, Chris Kraus, Jorge Pardo, Phaidon, London, 2008.
- Bonnie Clearwater, Veronica Gonzalez, Ruba Katrib, Jorge Pardo: House, Los Angeles County Museum of Art, Los Angeles, 2008.
- Alex Coles, Doris Krystof, et al., Jorge Pardo, Richter Verlag, Dusseldorf, 2009.
- Alex Coles, Michael Govan, Claudia Madrao Tecoh, Sternberg Press, Berlin, 2012.
