= William Drenttel =

American artist

- Born: October 14, 1953; Minneapolis, Minnesota
- Died: December 21, 2013 (aged 60); Branford, Connecticut
- Occupations: Author, educator, executive, graphic designer
- Years active: 1977–2013
- Known for: Design Observer
- Spouse: Jessica Helfand

William Drenttel (October 14, 1953 – December 21, 2013) was an author, publisher, graphic designer, educator, entrepreneur and executive. He was known as the co-founder and editorial director of Design Observer, one of the most influential online publications covering design, social innovation, urbanism and visual culture. Together with his wife Jessica Helfand, he taught at Yale University, and ran design studio Winterhouse, publishing house Winterhouse Editions, and design education non-profit Winterhouse Institute. In 2013, he was recognized with the AIGA Medal, one of the highest honors in the design profession.

== Early life and education ==
Drenttel was born in Minneapolis, Minnesota on October 14, 1953. He grew up in California where his family relocated to in 1954. He graduated in 1972 from Tustin High School in Tustin, California. From 1972 to 1977, he attended Princeton University in New Jersey, where he received a BA with an Independent Concentration in European Cultural Studies and Film.

== Career ==
=== Compton Advertising / Saatchi & Saatchi Compton Worldwide (1977–1985) ===
After graduating from Princeton, Drenttel joined Compton Advertising Inc. in New York City, a big advertising agency most known for managing the Procter & Gamble brands in the U.S. In 1982, Compton Advertising was acquired by Saatchi & Saatchi. Drenttel eventually became a senior vice president and management supervisor at Saatchi & Saatchi Compton Worldwide and managed over 20 different Procter & Gamble brands in the U.S., Canada and Italy. As a management director, he provided strategic leadership in the packaged goods, fast food, and telecommunications categories, managing the launch of the Procter & Gamble Pampers in Italy in 1980 and the AT&T account that launched cellular telephones in America in 1983. In 1984, after the breakup of AT&T, Drenttel won and managed the cellular telephones advertising accounts for two of the regional Bell Operating Companies, Ameritech and Pacific Telesis. His four years of international experience at Saatchi & Saatchi included one year managing P&G Canada accounts, and three years as a managing director of Saatchi & Saatchi Italy, during which time agency billings and staff increased five-fold.

=== Drenttel Doyle Partners (1985–1996) ===
By mid-1980s, Drenttel became disillusioned with advertising and more interested in graphic design. After leaving Saatchi & Saatchi in 1985, Drenttel co-founded Drenttel Doyle Partners, a small design and advertising firm that worked across corporate design, new product development, packaging, advertising, marketing, architectural and environmental graphics, and editorial design. For the following 12 years, Drenttel ran the firm with principals Stephen Doyle and Thomas Kluepfel. Drenttel Doyle Partners was first located at 77 Irving Place and then at 1123 Broadway, both in New York City.

Drenttel Doyle Partners made a significant impact on magazine design with its design of Spy Magazine and The New Republic in 1986. They also designed the identity for the World Financial Center in 1988; launched retail cash machines for Citibank in 1992; repositioned the Cooper-Hewitt Museum as the National Design Museum in 1995; designed Martha Stewart products into K-Mart in 1997; and created graphic identity programs for three national educational institutions: Teach for America in 1994, Edison Project in 1994 and Princeton University in 1996. Drenttel Doyle Partners’ clients included Brooklyn Academy of Music, Champion Paper, Elektra Records, Farrar Straus & Giroux, HarperCollins, Hewitt Associates, Inc. Magazine, Metropolitan Transportation Authority, Museum of Modern Art, National Audubon Society, The New Republic, Olympia & York, Springs Industries, St. Vincent's Hospital, and Wildlife Conservation Society.

After Drenttel left in 1996, Stephen Doyle continued to run the studio under the name Doyle Partners.

=== Winterhouse Studio and Winterhouse Editions (1997–2013) ===
Drenttel started Winterhouse Studio with his wife Jessica Helfand in 1997. Initially a two-person firm, it focused primarily on early website design for corporations and publications like The New Yorker, before growing into a five-person graphic design studio working in publishing, culture, education, design and social innovation. It first operated from 214 Sullivan Street, New York City before moving to a 1932 house that used to house Ezra Winter's painting studio in Falls Village, Connecticut in June 1998. From its rural location in northwest Connecticut, Drenttel sought to create a new kind of design practice that innovated how designers participate in large social issues and programs, both nationally and internationally.

Winterhouse Studio initially focused on publishing and editorial development; new media; and cultural, educational and literary institutions. The studio designed Netscape tools, browser and homepage in 1998-1999, University Business in 1998, New England Journal of Medicine in 2000, Legal Affairs, Norman Rockwell Museum in 2002, Berkshire Taconic Community Foundation in 2003, New York University School of Journalism and The Paris Review in 2004, Yale Law Journal in 2005, The New Yorker in 2007, Archives of American Art Journal, Yale Environment 360 and Teach For All in 2008, and Harvard Law Review in 2010. Additional clients included Yale University Press, Errol Morris, Stora Enso, Global Centre for the Responsibility to Protect, Smithsonian Archives of American Art, Children's Television Workshop.

Winterhouse Studio designed nearly 100 covers of Poetry Magazine with Drenttel serving as creative director of the newly-established Poetry Foundation from 2004 to 2008. Drenttel had a pivotal role in developing its strategic plan; broad involvement in long-term planning, program development and marketing; design of all collateral materials to support national programming; and design and development of the Foundation websites.

Winterhouse Editions was a publishing company run by Winterhouse Studios, focused on literature, design and cultural criticism. Books published included works by Paul Auster, Thomas Bernhard, Michael Bierut, Paul Celan, Gloria Feldt, Grolier Club, Jessica Helfand, William Helfand, Siri Hustvedt, Hans Erich Nossack, James Salter, Susan Sontag, Leon Wieseltier and Hanns Zischler. Some works were published under the Winterhouse imprint with the Yale University Press, University of Chicago Press and Princeton Architectural Press. Additionally, Winterhouse published Below the Fold, an occasional journal exploring topics through visual narrative and critical inquiry.

Jessica Helfand shut down Winterhouse Studio shortly after Drenttel's death in 2013.

=== Winterhouse Institute (2006–2013) ===
Drenttel established Winterhouse Institute in 2006 to focus on non-profit projects that support design innovation and education, as well as social and political initiatives. In 2011, Winterhouse Institute became a 501c3 non-profit organization. As of 2025, Winterhouse Institute continues its work in supporting design educators.

==== Winterhouse Awards ====
Created in 2006 in collaboration with AIGA, the Winterhouse Awards for Design Writing & Criticism aimed to increase the understanding of design, both within the profession and nationally. The $10,000 award (along with additional $1,000 student prizes) recognized the best in design writing by authors under 40 in the United States. The competition was discontinued in 2011.

==== Polling Place Photo Project ====
The Polling Place Photo Project was a 2006–2008 nationwide photography project created in collaboration with AIGA: an archive of photographs taken by American citizens at polling places on caucus and election days. It was launched in October 2006 before the U.S. midterm elections. For the 2008 Presidential elections, it was supported by The New York Times, with project photos appearing on the paper's homepage on Election Day, when Barack Obama was elected President. All project photographs were distributed with Creative Commons licensing.

==== Winterhouse Symposium on Design Education ====
Drenttel and Winterhouse Institute hosted symposiums on design education that brought together graduate design educators at the intersection of design and social change. The first Winterhouse Symposium on Design Education was held at Winterhouse Institute in October 2010 with 13 participants from a variety of design and business schools, discussing the challenges of their social-change initiatives. The 2010 symposium concluded with a plan to prototype a standardized method for reporting on social-design academic institutions. The second Winterhouse Symposium on Design Education took place at The Hotchkiss School in August 2011 with thirty participants.

==== 2009 Aspen Design Summit and 2010 Bellagio Design Symposium ====
Drenttel’s Winterhouse Institute, in collaboration with AIGA and Rockefeller Foundation, hosted the Aspen Design Summit in November 2009. The summit invited designers, educators, researchers and representatives of NGOs, foundations and businesses to collaborate in addressing large social problems: rural healthcare delivery, early childhood education needs in disaster areas, sustainable food systems, preventative medical healthcare testing, poverty alleviation in rural Alabama, and more. Institutional participants included the Centers for Disease Control, Mayo Clinic, UNICEF, Sustainable Health Enterprises, University of Alabama and Auburn University. He also sponsored Bellagio Design Symposium, “Reasons Not to Be Pretty: Symposium on Design, Social Change and the ‘Museum,’” held in April 2010 at the Rockefeller Foundation’s Bellagio Center in Italy. The conference gathered 22 designers, historians, curators, educators and journalists to discuss the museum's role in the 21st century in relation to design for social change, asking how museums should collect, archive and exhibit objects of social innovation.

=== Design Observer (2003–2012) ===
In October 2003, Drenttel, with Michael Bierut, Jessica Helfand and Rick Poynor founded Design Observer which became the leading international site for design, urbanism, social innovation and cultural observation, providing a forum for critical discussion and commentary. Drenttel became publisher and editorial director in 2010. Design Observer had seven Webby Awards nominations. A grant by the Rockefeller Foundation facilitated expansion of Design Observer Group in August 2009 to include Change Observer, Places and Observer Media channels. These channels developed new journalism focused on social innovation, urbanism and design within the public realm. By 2013, the site had published over 4,800 articles and essays by over 600 authors, with more than 183,000 unique monthly visitors.

=== Yale School of Management ===
Drenttel and his wife Jessica Helfand taught at Yale University. In 2007, Drenttel became a senior faculty fellow at the Yale School of Management where he taught design communications and design thinking. In 2009, he additionally became a fellow of the school's Program on Social Enterprise. During this period, Drenttel used Rockefeller Foundation funding to create a new series of case studies focused on design and social enterprise, placing design within the larger context of real world projects and encouraging design thinking as a means to create meaningful social impact. They included SELCO, a solar energy company in India; Mayo Clinic Center for Innovation, a healthcare innovation laboratory in Minnesota; Project Masiluleke, an HIV healthcare project in South Africa, and Teach For All, an international network for education innovation.

=== AIGA ===
Drenttel was president emeritus of AIGA, the largest design organization in the U.S. He led the organization as president from 1994 to 1996, through a period of significant change, including the opening of a new national headquarters in New York City, the appointment of a new executive director, new financial controls, the launch of the organization's first capital campaign, and program coordination with 52 regional chapters. He also co-edited the Looking Closer anthologies, books of essays on design published by AIGA. As president emeritus, Drenttel provided ongoing strategic and longterm planning consultation. In 2005, Drenttel assumed the role of national task force director for disaster relief for designers after the destruction of the Gulf States by hurricanes. In 2011, he supported the launch of the AIGA social change initiative, Design For Good. Drenttel also served as board member for the New York Chapter of AIGA from 1990 to 1992, and as a national board member from 1993 to 1996.

=== Teach for All ===
During 2008–2012 Drenttel was vice president of communications and design of Teach For All, an international organization supporting educational social enterprises. Teach For All acts as a global network for independent social enterprises that are working to expand their nation’s educational opportunities.

== Other professional and non-profit affiliations ==
Drenttel served as board member of The Poetry Society of America from 1993 to 1999, and vice president from 1997 to 1999, where he was responsible for strategic planning and the national expansion of the “Poetry in Motion” program to 20 transit systems nationwide.

Drenttel was a trustee of Cooper-Hewitt National Design Museum, serving on the board from 1998 to 2009. During his decade-long term, he was involved with executive, strategic planning, collections, and national design awards committees. In 2000, he and Jessica Helfand (with Jeffrey Tyson) designed the identity and trophy for the Cooper Hewitt American National Design Awards.

He served as board member and corporate advisor of Academic Partners LLC, a publishing company focused on the higher education marketplace, from 1999 to 2002. The company published magazines (Lingua Franca and University Business) and websites, ceasing operations in 2002.

From 2002 to 2006, Drenttel served as creative director for the Nextbook Foundation, which promoted books illuminating Jewish literature and culture. Drenttel had broad involvement in long-term planning and program development, identity and marketing, design of materials to support national programming, and design of the Nextbook website. (The editorial site was renamed and re-launched in 2009 as Tablet).

Drenttel served as vice president of the Susan Sontag Literary Foundation since 2007. The Foundation honors talented emerging artists in a variety of disciplines and promotes the international exchange of language and culture in the spirit of Susan Sontag's lifetime commitment to young artistic voices.

Drenttel was also co-director of the Transform Symposium at the Mayo Clinic Center for Innovation. He was a member of the Alliance Graphique Internationale since 2010, and the Grolier Club, a private bibliophilic club, since 1996. He lectured widely in the U.S. and abroad.

== Awards and fellowships ==
- New York University Institute of the Humanities, fellow (2003)
- Yale School of Management, senior faculty fellow, Social Enterprise Fellow (2007)
- Yale School of Management Design & Innovation Club, fellow
- Yale Program on Social Enterprise, Innovation, and Impact, fellow (2009)
- Rockefeller Foundation, $1.5 million grant (2009–2010)
- Henry Wolf Residency in Graphic Design at the American Academy in Rome (2010)
- Art Directors Club Hall of Fame (2010)
- Sappi Ideas That Matter grant (2010)
- The AIGA Medal (2013)

== Books ==
- Paul Auster: A Comprehensive Bibliographic Checklist of Published Work 1968-1994, Winterhouse Editions, 1994. (ISBN 978-1884381010)
- Graphic Design: New York 2: The Work of Thirty-Six Firms from the City That Put Graphic Design on the Map, with Michael Bierut and D. K. Holland.
- Looking Closer: Critical Writings on Graphic Design, with Michael Bierut, Steven Heller, D. K. HollandAllworth Press. (ISBN 978-1880559154)
- "Forty Posters for the Yale School of Architecture" by Michael Bierut, Winterhouse Editions, 2007 (ISBN 1884381189)

== Personal life ==
Drenttel lived in Hamden, Connecticut, with his wife Jessica Helfand, son Malcolm, and daughter Fiona. He died at the Connecticut Hospice in Branford on December 21, 2013 aged 60 after a year-and-a-half long battle with brain cancer.

== See also ==
- First Things First 2000 manifesto
- Emigre 51: First Things First, 1999.
