= Samuel Solomon =

- Engraving of Solomon by William Angus, 1805
- Born: c. 1745; Cork, Ireland
- Died: 21 May 1819; Bath, England
- Occupations: Manufacturer and seller of patent medicines
- Spouses: Elizabeth Aaron (m. c. 1789; died 1815); Jane Martin (m. 1815; died 1818); Sarah Mackinney (m. 1819)
- Relatives: Henry James Byron (great-grandson); Henry Newbolt (great-grandson)

Samuel Solomon (c. 1745 – 21 May 1819) was an Irish-born manufacturer and seller of patent medicines based in Liverpool. He is best known for his "Cordial Balm of Gilead", a sweet alcoholic tonic sold as a cure for a wide range of conditions and promoted especially against the supposed effects of masturbation.

Born into a Jewish family in Cork, Solomon sold remedies in Dublin before moving to Liverpool around 1789. In 1796 he obtained a medical degree from Marischal College, Aberdeen, and launched the balm, which he promoted through heavy advertising and his book A Guide to Health. The business made him wealthy: he built a mansion, Gilead House, on the edge of Liverpool and became a prominent figure in the town. Among his descendants were the playwright Henry James Byron and the poet Henry Newbolt.

== Early life ==
Solomon was born into a Jewish family in Cork, Ireland, around 1745. His father, Abraham Solomon, was a merchant and the community's shochet. His uncle, Isaac Solomon, was a druggist in Dublin from whom Samuel likely learned the patent medicine trade. (Note: Older accounts give conflicting details of Solomon's origins. The Jewish Encyclopedia (1906) has him born in 1780 and dying in London in 1818, and one later reference work puts his death around 1853. The Oxford Dictionary of National Biography gives his birth as 1768 or 1769, says that neither his parents nor his birthplace are known, and repeats a story that he began as a street hawker of shoe-blacking in Newcastle upon Tyne or hair curlers in Birmingham. It also describes him as a protégé of the quack William Brodum. William H. Helfand similarly states that he was probably born in Bristol to a poor family of itinerant peddlers, sold spectacles and shoe polish, and came under Brodum's influence. Following Louis Hyman, Gabriel A. Sivan places Solomon's birth in Cork around 1745, and cites a Dublin newspaper advertisement of 1772 showing him already established there as "Dr. Solomon", years before Brodum became known in London. Sivan suggests that the 1768/9 date may come from a confusion with Solomon's move to Dublin in 1768 and his father's naturalisation in 1769, or with other men of the same name.)

== Career ==
Around 1768 Solomon moved to Dublin, where he opened a depot selling remedies. He appears to have stayed until about 1789, when he and his uncle Isaac moved to Liverpool. They set up in the dockland district, where Samuel sold medicines in the Old Strand. Isaac left Liverpool for Manchester in 1795 and died the following year.

In 1796 Solomon received the degree of Doctor of Medicine from Marischal College, Aberdeen, on the recommendation of Drs Joseph Moore and Isaac Fisher. The college required no examination at the time; payment of fees and the recommendation of two qualified doctors were sufficient. A note attached to the entry in the college records states that there were strong suspicions that the degree had been obtained with forged certificates.

=== A Guide to Health ===
Title page of A Guide to Health (52nd edition)

Solomon's A Guide to Health, or Advice to Both Sexes in Nervous and Consumptive Complaints was first published around 1796. The book was essentially a vehicle for advertising Solomon's products. It combined testimonials and poems by grateful customers with advice on diet, fresh air, exercise and personal hygiene. Solomon claimed that the Guide ran to 66 editions and 120,000 copies. Historians consider the numbers inflated, and many editions differed only slightly from their predecessors.

=== Cordial Balm of Gilead ===
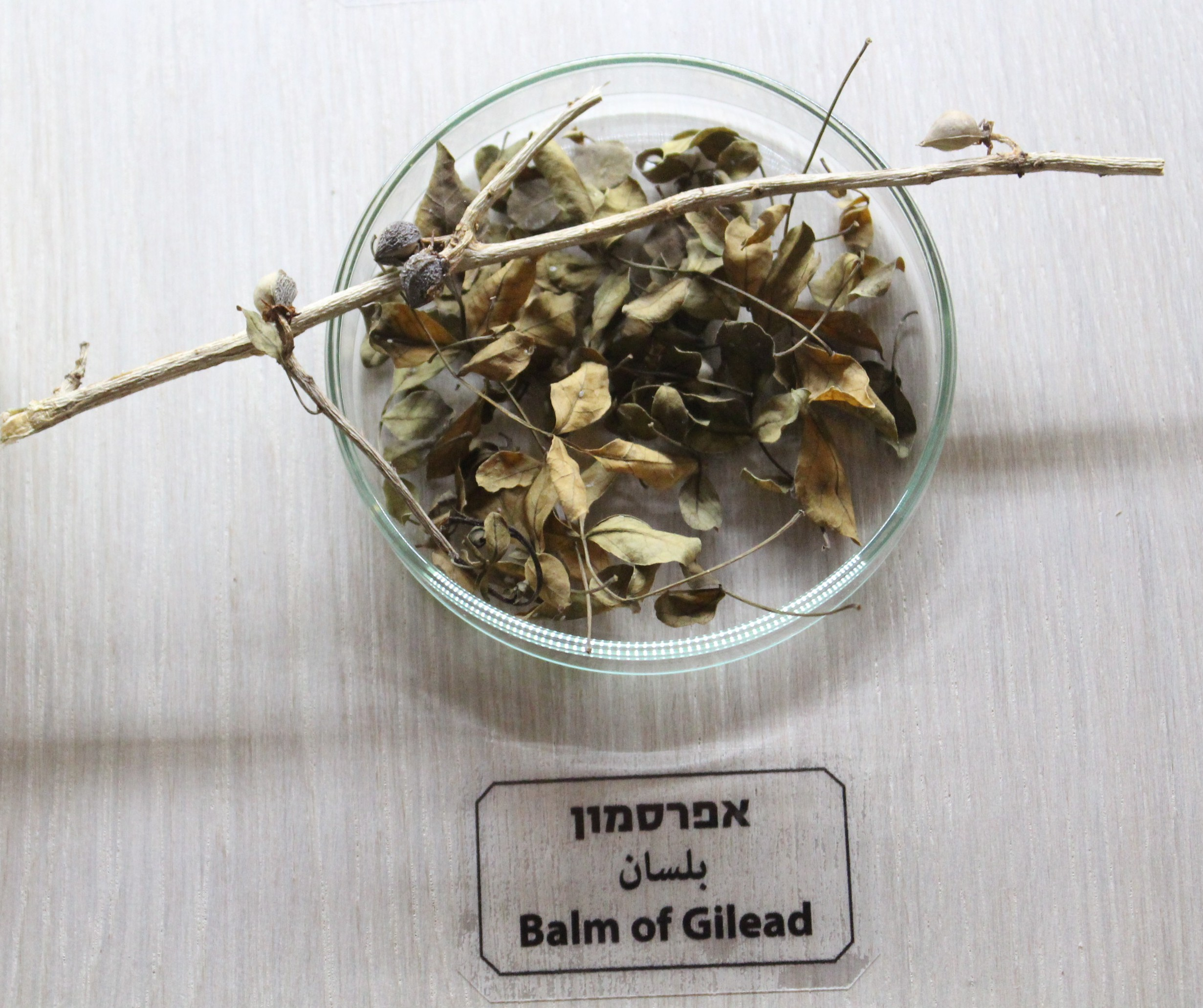
Afarsimon, the plant considered to be the basis of the biblical balm of Gilead

Solomon's best-known product, the "Cordial Balm of Gilead", was first marketed in 1796. Its name came from Jeremiah 8:22 ("Is there no balm in Gilead?"). Solomon's sales literature claimed that the balm had been growing in Gilead as early as 1730 BC, and that it had been endorsed by the most learned physicians. It cited the Berlin botanist Carl Ludwig Willdenow as an authority on the balm, although Willdenow had written about the biblical balm of Gilead and did not mention Solomon's product. The recommended dose was two teaspoonfuls to a tablespoonful three times a day, taken alone, in water, or in wine. A bottle of less than half a pint cost half a guinea (10s. 6d.).

Unlike most medicines of the period, the Balm of Gilead tasted pleasant. Solomon never revealed its formula, though he stressed that it contained neither cantharides nor mercury. In an 1808 letter to Joseph Banks, the physician Thomas Beddoes suggested that the balm was simply coloured gin. A report in The Gazette of Health in 1816 claimed that a bottle of the balm contained two ounces of highly rectified spirit, half a drachm of burnt sugar, two ounces of water, and six drops of essential oil. Historian William H. Helfand concludes that the best evidence points to French brandy flavoured with spices and herbs.

Solomon's advertisements promoted the balm for a wide range of conditions. These included "nervous disorders, juvenile indiscretions, head-aches, debility, seminal weakness, lowness of spirits, female complaints, loss of appetite, relaxation, indigestion, coughs and colds, consumptions, weaknesses, impurity of blood, an ill-cured lues, [and] gleets." The advertising especially stressed use against the supposed effects of masturbation, and it recommended the balm to boys and young men. By the 60th edition of the Guide to Health (c. 1812), about a fifth of the book was taken up by an essay "On Debility Arising from Self Abuse", which listed dire physical and mental consequences of the practice. Solomon recommended that patients take the balm and bathe their testicles in cold water or a mixture of vinegar and alcohol.

=== Other products and promotion ===
1800 advertisement for the Cordial Balm of Gilead

Solomon also sold Anti-Impetigenes (or Solomon's Drops), a supposed blood purifier, and an Abstergent Lotion for skin eruptions and blemishes, but the balm remained his main product.

He was an aggressive publicist for himself and his remedies. His advertising bill reached £5,000 a year from 1800, supported by an elaborate distribution system. He also claimed to have agents in the major European capitals, in India and in most American states. From 1800 to 1803 Solomon toured the United States to promote his products. He had a local edition of the Guide to Health printed and sold in New York, then moved his campaign to Philadelphia.

Solomon took pains to present himself as a respectable physician. He commissioned at least ten engraved portraits of himself from several artists as frontispieces for the Guide, some with a coat of arms of his own devising and the motto Mens sana in corpore sano.

== Personal and public life ==
Around 1789 Solomon married Elizabeth Aaron, eldest daughter of Moses Aaron (1718–1812), a pencil maker and ordained rabbi in Birmingham. They had ten children: three sons and seven daughters. She died at home on 14 March 1815. Three months later Solomon, then about seventy, married Jane Martin. She died childless in December 1818, aged 38. In January 1819 he married for the third time, to Sarah Mackinney, who survived him; they had no children.

In 1804 Solomon built Gilead House, a mansion in Kensington Fields, by the road to Prescot on the eastern edge of Liverpool. The house served as the family home, a residence for patients and a factory, with the medicines made in a rear wing. It was also the address to which orders and enquiries were sent. Solomon charged a guinea for a personal consultation and half a guinea for written advice.

Solomon became one of Liverpool's well-known figures. He lived in style, carrying a gold-handled cane and entertaining the town's leading citizens lavishly. His coach and horses were said to rival those of the Earls of Derby and Sefton. Several anecdotes about him circulated. According to one, when dinner guests insisted on sampling the balm, each later received an envelope containing a bill for a guinea. In another story, Marie Tussaud came to Gilead House to take a cast of his face for her waxworks but forgot to leave breathing holes, nearly suffocating him. He tore off the mould and refused to sit again.

At the 1818 general election, Solomon organised the Liverpool campaign of Lord Sefton. At a reputed cost of £1,000, he filled the town with banners and ribbons, sent electors letters signed as "the friend of Lord Sefton", and hired a band to escort supporters to the poll. Sefton nevertheless finished last, and George Canning was elected.

== Death and burial ==
Entrance gates to Grant Gardens

In 1797 Solomon bought a family burial plot in the Manchester Jewish cemetery at Pendleton, and his infant son Henry was buried there in 1798. However, he later built a private family mausoleum on land he owned south of Liverpool. His daughter Sophia, who died aged 21 in 1813, was the first to be buried there, followed by her mother in 1815. Solomon died in North Parade, Bath, on 21 May 1819, and his body was taken to the mausoleum. His daughter Sarah was the last to be interred there, on 17 November 1824.

Solomon's estate was valued at £30,000, with the business and its secret formulas worth another £30,000. After his death the firm was run by its manager, Ebenezer Daniell, who received a life interest in the estate. Sales of the balm fell sharply, mainly because Solomon had not appointed a reliable wholesaler. According to one account, his instructions that his newspaper advertising should continue after his death were not followed. The firm collapsed after Daniell's death in 1842, and by the middle of the 19th century the balm had been displaced by more heavily promoted remedies for the same conditions.

In 1840 a railway company bought the mausoleum site to shorten its Runcorn–Liverpool line. The mausoleum was demolished and the remains were moved to the Liverpool Necropolis. The Necropolis itself was cleared in 1912, and its site is now Grant Gardens. Gilead House was torn down in 1846 as the town expanded, and its land was sold for development.

== Reception ==
Solomon attracted both praise and ridicule. Some depictions of him drew on antisemitic stereotypes.

Robert Southey gave a mocking account of the balm in a letter of 1801. In The Detection of Quackery (1802), John Corry mocked the purchased "Scotch degree" and dismissed the Guide as dull and obscene. An 1808 guide to Lancashire architecture described Gilead House as a "monument to human credulity". Robert Watt's Bibliotheca Britannica (1824) called the Guide a patchwork of "the author's own advertisements and Aristotle's masterpiece".

Charles Lamb wrote an epigram in 1802, first printed in 1820, titled "On a Late Empiric of 'Balmy' Memory", playing on the biblical King Solomon's knowledge of plants:

His namesake, born of Jewish breeder,
Knew 'from the Hyssop to the Cedar'
But he, unlike the Jewish leader,
Scarce knew the Hyssop from the Cedar.

== Legacy ==
All of the children who survived Solomon eventually married non-Jews, except his son John, who never married. Among his descendants were the playwright, actor and theatre manager Henry James Byron, the poet and naval historian Sir Henry Newbolt, and the barrister and writer Sir Francis Newbolt.

Since the 1860s, three small streets near Kensington Gardens in Liverpool have been named after him and his balm: Balm Street, Gilead Street and Solomon Street. Streets named after the Beatles now occupy the area across the road where Gilead House stood.

A passage in the "Oxen of the Sun" episode of James Joyce's Ulysses, mocking a moralist who dispenses "his balm of Gilead in nostrums and apothegms of dubious taste to restore to health a generation of unfledged profligates", is believed to be a reference to Solomon.
