= Alex Coles =

Alex Coles may refer to:

- Alex Coles (art critic)
- Alex Coles (rugby union)
