= Rick Poynor =

British graphic designer

- Born: United Kingdom
- Language: English
- Genre: Journalism, graphic design, art

Rick Poynor is an English writer on design, graphic design, typography, and visual culture.

== Career ==
He began as a general visual arts journalist, working on Blueprint magazine in London. After founding Eye magazine, which he edited from 1990 to 1997, he focused increasingly on visual communication. He is writer-at-large and columnist of Eye, and a contributing editor and columnist of Print magazine.

In 1999, Poynor was a co-ordinator of the First Things First 2000 manifesto initiated by Adbusters. In 2003, he co-founded Design Observer, a weblog for design writing and discussion, with William Drenttel, Jessica Helfand, and Michael Bierut. He wrote for the site until 2005. He was a visiting professor at the Royal College of Art, London from 1994 to 1999 and returned to the RCA in 2006 as a research fellow. He also taught at the Jan van Eyck Academy in Maastricht. In 2004, Poynor curated the exhibition, Communicate: Independent British Graphic Design since the Sixties, at the Barbican Art Gallery in London. The exhibition subsequently travelled to four venues in China and to Zurich.

Poynor's writing encompasses both cultural criticism and design history, and his books break down into three categories. He wrote several monographs about significant British figures in the arts and design: Brian Eno (musician), Nigel Coates (architect), Vaughan Oliver (graphic designer), and Herbert Spencer (graphic designer). Other books document and analyse general movements in graphic design and typography. Among these are Typography Now, the first international survey of the digital typography of the late 1980s and early 1990s (Typography Now Two followed five years later), and No More Rules, a critical study of graphic design and postmodernism.

Poynor also published three essay collections, Design Without Boundaries, Obey the Giant, and Designing Pornotopia, which explore the cultural implications of visual communication, including advertising, photography, branding, graphic design, and retail design. In 2020, Yale University Press published his book about the work of graphic designer David King. In 2023, Occasional Papers published Why Graphic Culture Matters, a collection of 46 of his essays written over the past two decades.

Poynor was a prominent interviewee in the 2007 documentary film Helvetica.

== Published work ==
=== As author ===
- Why Graphic Culture Matters, Rick Poynor, Occasional Papers, 2023. ISBN 978-1-9196277-1-7
- More Dark Than Shark (with Brian Eno and Russell Mills), Faber & Faber, 1986.
- Nigel Coates: The City in Motion, Fourth Estate, 1989.
- Typography Now: The Next Wave (co-editor with Edward Booth-Clibborn), Booth-Clibborn, 1991. ISBN 978-1-873968-42-0.
- The Graphic Edge, Booth-Clibborn, 1993. ISBN 978-0-89134-587-9.
- Typography Now Two: Implosion (editor), Booth-Clibborn, 1996. ISBN 978-1-86154-023-2.
- Design Without Boundaries: Visual Communication in Transition, Booth-Clibborn, 1998. ISBN 978-1-86154-006-5.
- Looking Closer 3: Classic Writings on Graphic Design (co-editor with Michael Bierut, Jessica Helfand and Steven Heller), Allworth, 1999.
- Vaughan Oliver: Visceral Pleasures, Booth-Clibborn, 2000. ISBN 978-1-86154-072-0.
- Obey the Giant: Life in the Image World, 2nd edition, Birkhauser, 2007. ISBN 978-3-7643-8500-2.
- Typographica, Princeton Architectural Press, 2001. ISBN 978-1-56898-298-4.
- No More Rules: Graphic Design and Postmodernism, Laurence King, 2003. ISBN 978-1-85669-229-8.
- Communicate: Independent British Graphic Design since the Sixties (editor), Laurence King, 2004.
- Designing Pornotopia: Travels in Visual Culture, Laurence King, 2006. ISBN 978-1-85669-489-6.
- David King: Designer, Activist, Visual Historian, Yale University Press, 2020. ISBN 9780300250107
- Why Graphic Culture Matters, Occasional Papers, 2023. ISBN 9781919627717

=== As contributor ===
- Michael Bierut, William Drenttel, Steven Heller and D.K. Holland (editors), Looking Closer: Critical Writings on Graphic Design, Allworth, 1994. ISBN 978-1-880559-15-4.
- Jeremy Myerson (editor), Beware Wet Paint: Designs by Alan Fletcher, Phaidon, 1996.
- Marvin Scott Jarrett and Dean Kuipers (editors), Ray Gun: Out of Control, Booth-Clibborn, 1997. ISBN 978-1-86154-040-9.
- Michael Bierut, William Drenttel, Steven Heller and D.K. Holland (editors), Looking Closer 2: Critical Writings on Graphic Design, Allworth, 1997. ISBN 978-1-880559-56-7.
- Peter Hall and Michael Bierut (editors), Tibor Kalman: Perverse Optimist, Booth-Clibborn, 1998. ISBN 978-1-86154-092-8.
- Steven Heller (editor), The Education of a Graphic Designer, Allworth, 1998. ISBN 978-1-880559-99-4.
- Stephen Coates and Alex Stetter (editors), Impossible Worlds: The Architecture of Perfection, August/Birkhauser, 2000. ISBN 978-3-7643-6317-8.
- Michael Bierut, William Drenttel and Steven Heller (editors), Looking Closer Four: Critical Writings on Graphic Design, Allworth, 2002. ISBN 978-1-58115-235-7.
- Emily King (editor), Designed by Peter Saville, Frieze, 2003. ISBN 978-0-9527414-2-8.
- Susan Yelavich (editor), Profile: Pentagram Design, Phaidon, 2004. ISBN 978-0-7148-4377-3.
- William S. Saunders (editor), Commodification and Spectacle in Architecture, University of Minnesota Press, 2005.
- Alex Coles (editor), Design and Art, Whitechapel/MIT Press, 2007. ISBN 978-0-262-53289-1.
- Michael Bierut, William Drenttel and Steven Heller (editors), Looking Closer Five: Critical Writings on Graphic Design, Allworth, 2007. ISBN 978-1-58115-471-9.

=== As editor of Monographics series ===
- Andrea Codrington, Kyle Cooper, Laurence King, 2003. ISBN 978-1-85669-329-5.
- Veronique Vienne, Chip Kidd, Laurence King, 2003.
- Alston W. Purvis, H.N. Werkman, Laurence King, 2004. ISBN 978-1-85669-329-5.
- Daniel Raeburn, Chris Ware, Laurence King, 2004. ISBN 978-1-85669-397-4.

== See also ==
- List of Eye magazine issues
- First Things First 2000 manifesto
