= Jannuzzi =

Jannuzzi is an Italian surname. Notable people with the surname include:

- Lino Jannuzzi (born 1928), Italian journalist and politician
- Luigi Jannuzzi (born 1952), American comedic playwright
- Michele Jannuzzi, co-founder of design studio Jannuzzi Smith
