= Jancee Dunn =

American journalist

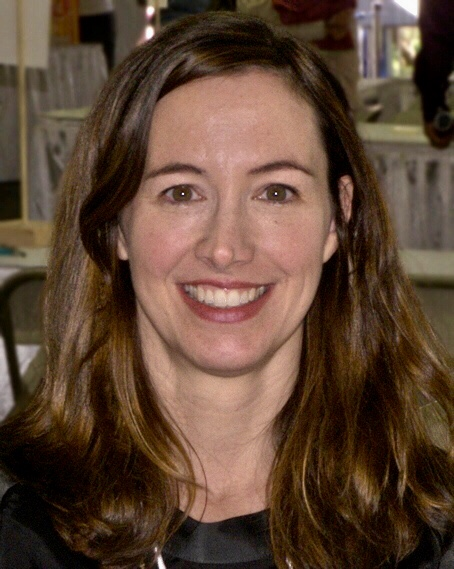
- Dunn at the 2009 Texas Book Festival
- Born: May 18, 1966 (age 60)
- Education: University of Delaware
- Occupations: Journalist; author; video jockey
- Spouse: Tom Vanderbilt
- Children: 1

Jancee Dunn (born May 18, 1966) is an American journalist, author and former VJ. She is a columnist with The New York Times.

She was a contributing editor at O, The Oprah Magazine but is mostly known for her work at Rolling Stone, where she worked from 1989 to 2003.

== Background ==
She grew up in Chatham, New Jersey and attended University of Delaware but dropped out of her bachelor's course in English. Her husband is the print and Internet journalist Tom Vanderbilt. They have one daughter, Sylvie Wren, born May 5, 2009.

== Rolling Stone ==
Dunn has written for Rolling Stone since 1989; her first cover story was with Liz Phair. She has covered celebrities including Green Day, Bono, Madonna, Dolly Parton and Brad Pitt for the magazine.

== Other work ==
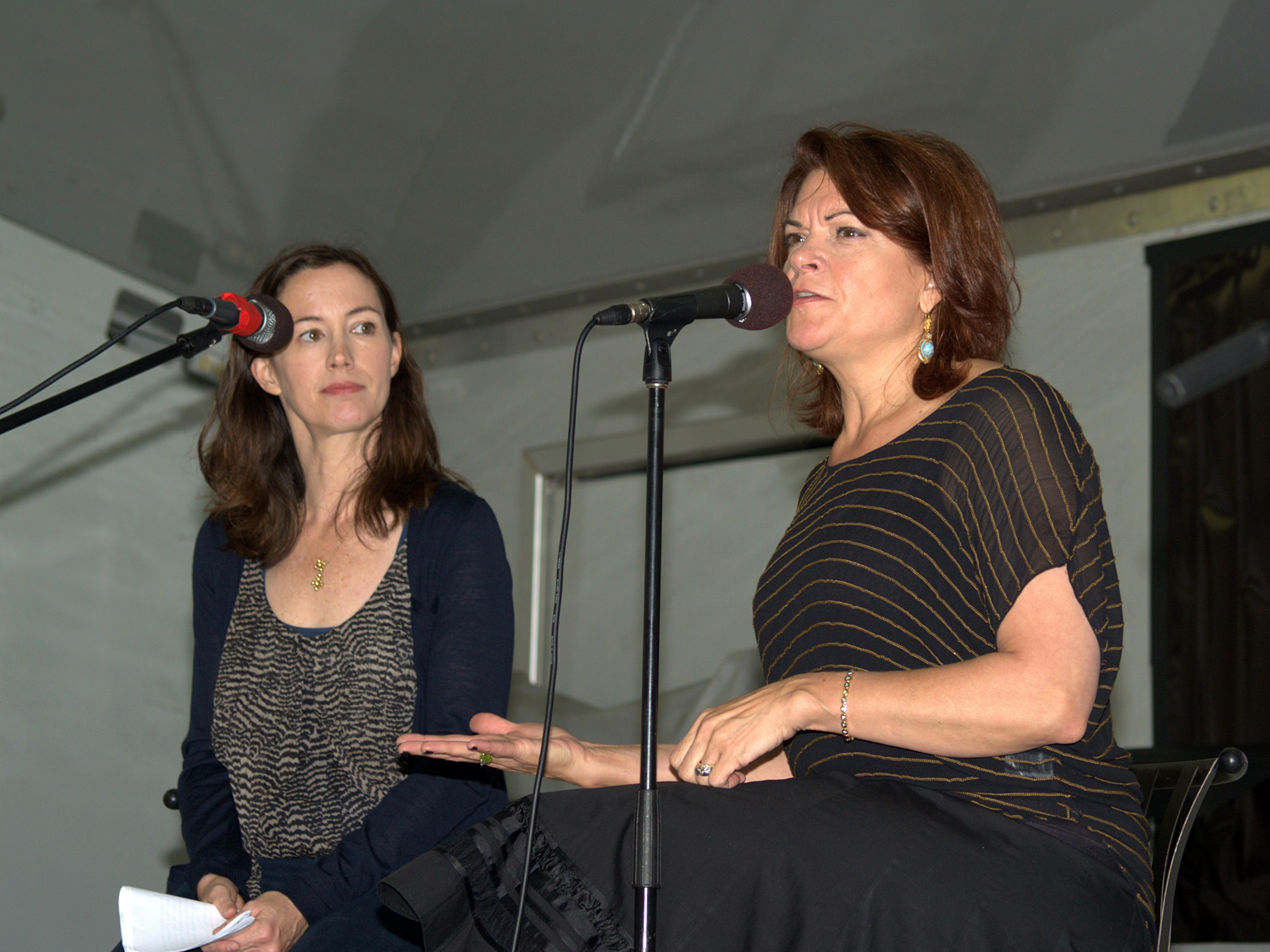
Dunn interviewing Rosanne Cash at the 2010 Brooklyn Book Festival.

Dunn was also one of the original on-air personalities for MTV2, from 1996 until 2001. She writes for a number of publications, including O, The Oprah Magazine, Vogue, Jane, The New York Times, and others. For five years, she was a sex columnist at GQ under the pseudonym of Dr. Sooth. She contributed to Good Morning America between 2001 and 2002.

Dunn is also the author of But Enough About Me: A Jersey Girl's Unlikely Adventures Among the Absurdly Famous (titled But Enough About Me: From Eighties Geek To Rock & Roll Chic outside North America), published in June 2006 by HarperCollins. It was an autobiography that chronicled her transformation from a suburban girl to contributing editor at one of the most glamorous magazines in the world. The book received a positive review from Publishers Weekly.

== Books ==
- But Enough About Me: How a Small-Town Girl Went from Shag Carpet to the Red Carpet (2006) ISBN 9780060843656
- But Enough about Me: Adventures in Celebsville (2007) ISBN 9780755315727
- Don't You Forget about Me (2008) ISBN 9780345501905
- Why Is My Mother Getting a Tattoo? And Other Questions I Wish I Never Had to Ask (2009) ISBN 9780345501929
- (Illustrated by Scott Nash) I'm Afraid Your Teddy is in Trouble Today (2017) ISBN 978-0-7636-7537-0
- How Not to Hate Your Husband After Kids (2017) ISBN 9780316267090
- Hot and Bothered: What No One Tells You About Menopause and How to Feel Like Yourself Again (2023) ISBN 9780593542569
