= Jessica Helfand =

American artist and writer

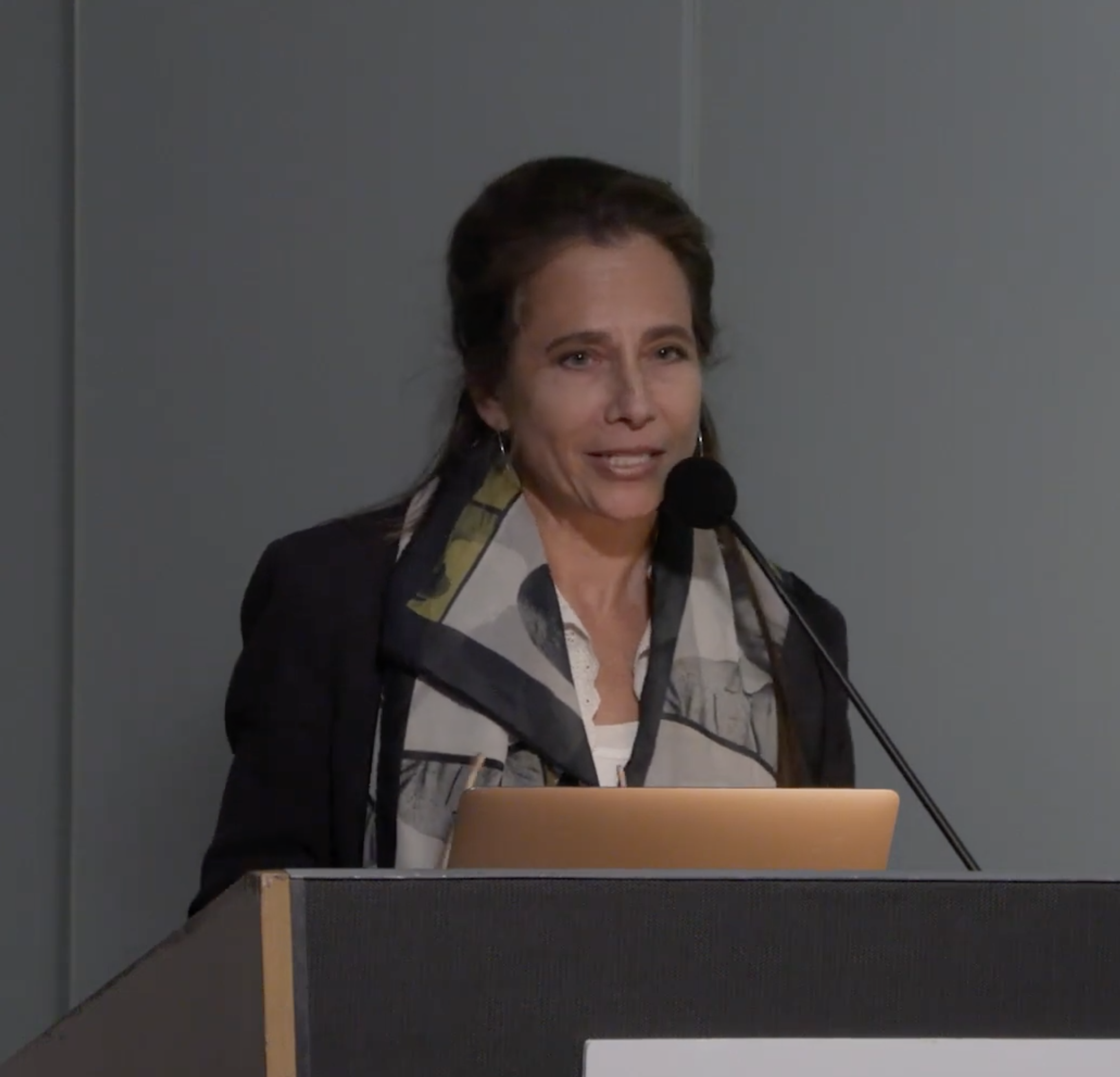
- Helfand speaking at an event held at Cooper Hewitt design museum, 2019
- Born: 1960 (age 65–66); Philadelphia, Pennsylvania, U.S.
- Education: Yale University (BA, MFA)
- Occupations: Artist, writer, designer
- Known for: Art, writing, design

Jessica Helfand (born 1960) is an American artist, writer, and designer. A founding editor of the Design Observer, she is the author of numerous books on visual and cultural criticism.

== Early life and education ==
Born in Philadelphia, Helfand was raised in Paris and New York City and graduated from George School in Newtown, Pennsylvania, in 1978. She received her BA (in graphic design and architectural theory) in 1982 and her MFA (in graphic design) in 1989, both from Yale University. She is the daughter of the late collector William H. Helfand.

== Career ==
=== Early career ===
From 1982 until 1986, Helfand wrote soap operas for Procter & Gamble, and eventually became a junior scriptwriter on CBS's Guiding Light. That year, Guiding Light won the Daytime Emmy for best writing.

In 1990, she was appointed design director for the Philadelphia Inquirer Magazine, and three years later, she started her own studio.

=== Yale University ===
For more than twenty years, Helfand taught at Yale University, where she was senior critic in graphic design, the artist in residence at the Yale Institute for Network Science, a faculty affiliate in the history of science and medicine, and a lecturer in Yale College. From 2009 to 2016 she taught two freshman seminars "Studies in Visual Biography" and "Blue,". Then, from 2016 to 2018 she taught design at Yale School of Management. "We will approach it as one might a second language," she explained, "introducing theory and practice, defining visual grammar, reframing expression, construction, and craft."

With Andrew Howard and Hamish Muir, Helfand was a co-founder of the summer editorial course in Porto, Portugal. She was a visiting professor at Wesleyan University (2012) and at Paris College of Art (2014). In 2019, she was appointed visiting professor at the University of Hertfordshire in the UK.

=== Winterhouse Studio ===
Helfand and her late partner William Drenttel founded Winterhouse Studio — a design studio, institute, publishing imprint, and foundation — in 1997. Alongside William Drenttel, she held the first Henry Wolf Residency at the American Academy in Rome in 2010. They co-directed Winterhouse until Drenttel's death in 2013.

=== Design Observer ===
In 2003, along with Michael Bierut and Rick Poynor, they launched the Design Observer blog and website. With Michael Bierut, Helfand cohosted 132 episodes of The Observatory (2014 to 2019); in 2016, they launched a second podcast, The Design of Business | The Business of Design, which spawned an annual conference by the same name. Fortune Senior Editor Ellen McGirt took over as the show's new co-host in the fall of 2019.

=== Writing ===
Helfand has written for many national publications, including the Los Angeles Times Book Review, Aperture, and The New Republic. She is the author of numerous books on design and cultural criticism, including Paul Rand: American Modernist (1998), Screen: Essays on Graphic Design, New Media and Visual Culture (2001) and Reinventing the Wheel (2002), which formed the basis for an exhibit in 2004 at the Grolier Club in New York City. Her critically acclaimed Scrapbooks: An American History (Yale University Press, 2008) was named "the best of this year's gift books" by The New York Times. Design: The Invention of Desire, was published in 2016 by Yale University Press. Culture is Not Always Popular, a fifteen-year anthology of Design Observer was co-edited by Michael Bierut and Jarrett Fuller, and was published by MIT Press in 2018. Face: A Visual Odyssey was published in 2019, also by MIT Press. In 2021, she designed a new graphically reimagined edition of Ralph Waldo Emerson's essay Self-Reliance — with twelve accompanying essays by Helfand — published by Thames & Hudson.

Appointed by the postmaster general to the U.S. Citizens Stamp Advisory Committee in 2006, Helfand chaired the Design Subcommittee until 2012. She was a 2018 Director's Guest at Civitella Ranieri, a 2019 fellow at the Bogliasco Foundation, and the 2020 Artist in Residence at the California Institute of Technology.

=== Artificial intelligence ===
Helfand uses images generated with use of AI in her painting practice. Her 2024 exhibition, The Service Society — a series of portraits based on the Irish domestic servants who were employed by a number of wealthy American families during the Gilded Age — is informed by extensive archival research. A solo show of thirty-five of these paintings was held in the spring of 2024 at Jim Kempner Fine Art gallery in New York. The gallery featured eight new paintings as part of the INKMiami Art Fair, at Art Basel Miami later that same year.

As a comparatively early practitioner working with technology in her studio practice, Helfand has been invited to participate in several conversations about AI and its relationship to the creative process. She spoke at Cooper Hewitt in 2019 as part of an exhibition featured in that year's London Design Biennale (which took top honors); at Caltech in 2023, and later that same year, in an online symposium sponsored by the Royal College of Art in London. As a visual artist, she has spoken widely about AI's potential to generate and gestate new ideas about form, particularly regarding her own work in portraiture.

== Artistry ==
In a 2021 lecture, Helfand explained her practice this way:

"For me, painting is the act of bearing witness: adding dimension, shifting focus... a kind of photo-based, adaptive portraiture, reasserting an implicit, if hidden dignity to the people I paint. An anonymous subject is not a lost subject, but a noble one, with the enduring humanity that we can't help but recognize as our own."

She elaborates further on her website:

The artist's work centers on character study and draws on research, particularly primary sources such as letters, diaries, photographs, and ephemera. According to the artist, these materials provide documentary evidence for depicting a subject's imagined put plausible human experience, and the resulting observations are adapted from the experiences of others rather than the artist's own. The artist has likened this approach to method acting.

== Design affiliations and awards ==
Helfand is a member of the Alliance Graphique Internationale and the Art Directors Club Hall of Fame. In 2013, she won the AIGA medal with her late partner William Drenttel.

== Books ==
- Face: A Visual Odyssey, MIT Press. (ISBN 978-0262043427)
- Culture is Not Always Popular, with Michael Bierut, MIT Press. (ISBN 978-0262039109)
- Design: The Invention of Desire, Yale University Press. (ISBN 978-0300205091)
- Scrapbooks: An American History, Yale University Press. (ISBN 978-0300126358)
- Screen: Essays on Graphic Design, New Media, and Visual Culture, with John Maeda, Princeton Architectural Press. (ISBN 978-1568983103)
- Reinventing the Wheel, Princeton Architectural Press. (ISBN 978-1568985961)
- Looking Closer 3, Vol. 3: Classic Writings on Graphic Design with Michael Bierut, Steven Heller and Rick Poynor, Allworth Press. (ISBN 978-1581150223)
- Paul Rand: American Modernist, William Drenttel Editions. (ISBN 978-1884381164)
- Graphic Design America 2: The work of many of the best and brightest design firms from across the United States, with DK Holland and Chip Kidd, Rockport Publishers. (ISBN 978-1564966810)
- Bader, Sara (2013). The Designer Says: Quotes, Quips, and Words of Wisdom. Princeton Architectural Press. ISBN 978-1-61689-134-3.

== See also ==
- First Things First 2000 manifesto
