= Design Observer =

Architecture and design website

- Available in: English
- Owner: Observer Omnimedia
- Creators: Rick Poynor, Michael Bierut, Jessica Helfand and William Drenttel
- Editor: William Drenttel
- Website: designobserver.com
- Commercial: Yes
- Launched: October 2003; 22 years ago

Design Observer is a website devoted to a range of design topics including graphic design, social innovation, urbanism, popular culture, and criticism. The content of the site includes essays, articles, reviews, blog posts, and peer reviewed scholarship. It is the host of the architecture and urban design publication Places (formerly a print academic journal) and the podcast Design Matters with Debbie Millman.

Four prominent design writers founded the site in October 2003: Rick Poynor was the founder and first editor of London-based Eye magazine, in addition to being author of many books; Michael Bierut is a partner in the New York office of Pentagram and is a design critic at Yale School of Art; Jessica Helfand is also a critic at Yale and is author of numerous books; the late William Drenttel (1953–2013) was a designer, critic and partner with Jessica Helfand of Winterhouse Studios in Connecticut.

Frequent contributors over the years have included; Steven Heller, John Foster, Adrian Shaughnessy, Dmitri Siegel, Alice Twemlow, Tom Vanderbilt, Lorraine Wild, Rob Walker, Alexandra Lange, Mark Lamster, John Thackara, Véronique Vienne, Julie Lasky and more.

In 2016, Design Observer and AIGA joined forces to work in collaboration as a larger online platform for design.
