= Trickett & Webb =

Trickett & Webb was a London-based graphic design agency. In 2003, it ceased trading after 32 years, citing succession issues.

Lynn Trickett and Brian Webb met in 1970, whilst working at the Derek Forsyth Partnership in London. They formed the agency Trickett & Webb in the following year. Their work included designs for posters, packaging, corporate identity as well as exhibition design. Their clients included a wide range of national and international clients such as British Airways, Volvo, WH Smith, Boots, London Transport, Royal Mail, Penguin Books, P&O and the BBC.

Trickett & Webb received more than 100 design awards around the world including New York Art Directors, Communication Arts USA, Packaging Design Council USA, Museum of Toyama Japan, Red Dot Germany, D&AD and Design Week and their work has been exhibited worldwide including Communicate: Independent British Graphic Design since the Sixties (Barbican Art Gallery, London 2004) and have work in the permanent collections of the Victoria & Albert Museum, Museum of Modern Art and London Transport Museum.

Brian Webb formed Webb & Webb Design Limited in 2003.
