= Michael Bierut =

American graphic designer (born 1957)

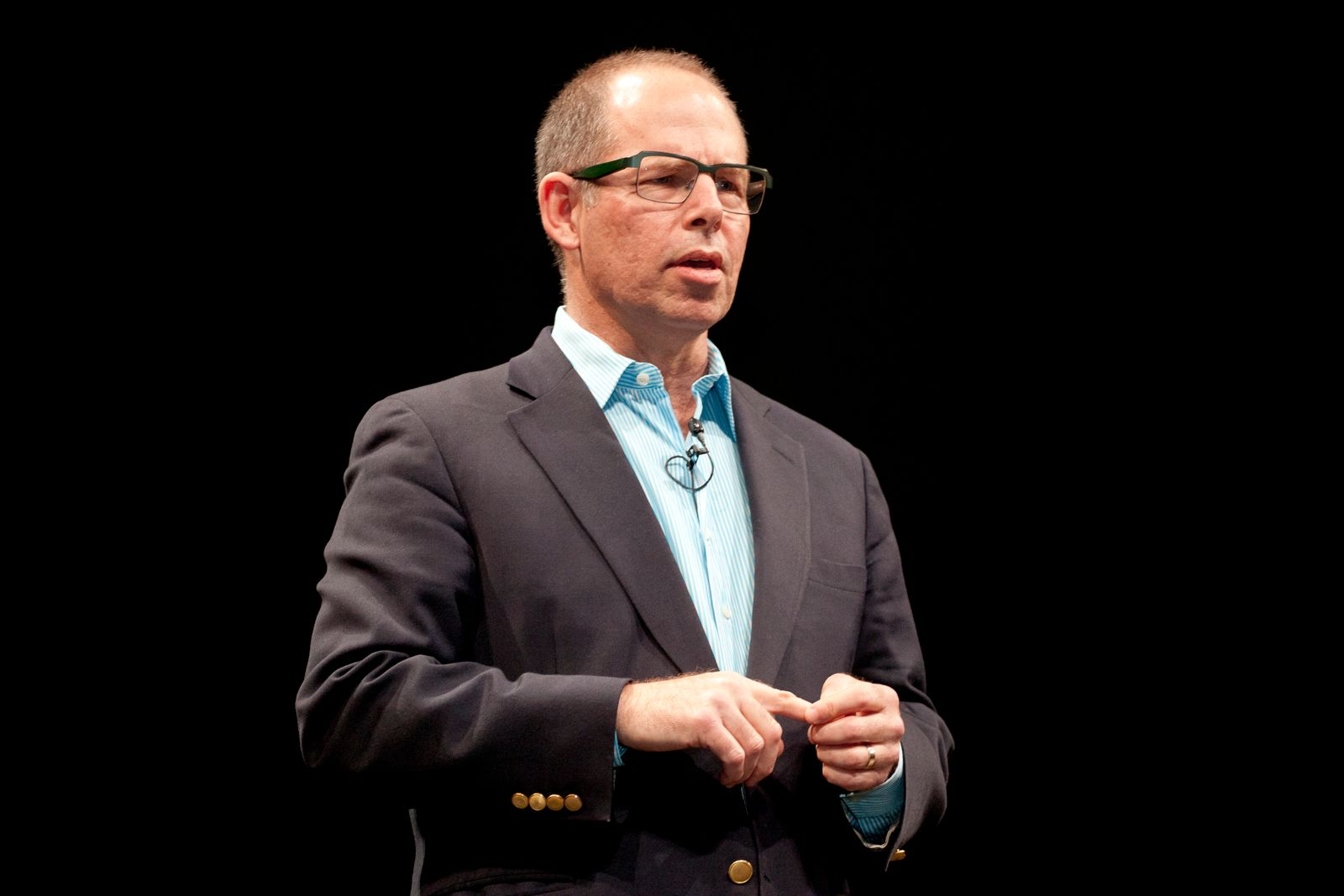
- Born: August 29, 1957 (age 68); Cleveland, Ohio, U.S.
- Education: University of Cincinnati College of Design, Architecture, Art, and Planning
- Occupation: Graphic designer
- Employer: Pentagram
- Spouse: Dorothy Kresz

Michael Bierut (born 1957) is a graphic designer, design critic and educator, who has been a partner at design firm Pentagram since 1990. He designed the logo for Hillary Clinton's 2016 presidential campaign.

== Early life and education ==
Michael Bierut was born in 1957 in Cleveland, Ohio. His mother Anne Marie was a housewife, and his father worked in printing press sales. His family lived in Garfield Heights and he attended Saturday morning classes at the Cleveland Museum of Art where he developed his drawing skills. The family moved to the suburb Parma in 1967, and he attended Normandy High School, graduating in 1975.

In the ninth grade, Bierut created his first poster for a school play and came to a realization that he wanted to create things with purpose. He also enjoyed album cover art and discovered the book Graphic Design Manual by Armin Hofmann and Milton Glaser: Graphic Design. He studied graphic design at the University of Cincinnati's College of Design, Architecture, Art and Planning (DAAP) as a result of these influences. While in school, he interned for three months for Chris Pullman, an AIGA medalist and a Yale professor, at a Boston public television station, WGBH. In late summer of 1978, after completing the internship, Bierut travelled from Boston to New York City and shared his portfolio with Massimo Vignelli of Vignelli Associates, and was offered a job on the spot. Bierut graduated in 1980 from DAAP with a bachelors of science in graphic design and moved to New York City to work for Vignelli a week later.

== Career ==
=== Vignelli Associates ===
After his graduation in 1980, Bierut began working for Vignelli Associates in New York. At the time, the studio didn't have a computer or fax machine and Bierut was responsible for creating mechanical boards by hand. He credits his youthful exuberance in staying up late for the progress he made as a designer while working for Vignelli. He also learned that people don't always read a company's printed materials and strived to create engaging work that people would want to read. Speaking about his relationship with the Vignellis, Bierut said "I learned an enormous amount from Massimo about how to be a good designer. But I learned how to be a successful designer from Lella." He worked at the studio for 10 years, eventually becoming vice president.

=== Pentagram ===
In 1990, Bierut became a partner in the New York office of Pentagram after a discussion with partner Woody Pirtle. At Pentagram, he has championed the democratization of design to make his design work easily digestable to the viewer. Bierut's frequent incorporation of the Helvetica font, known for its legibility and ubiquity, has become a symbol of his projects at Pentagram.

At Pentagram, Bierut has had numerous clients such as Alliance for Downtown New York, Benetton, the Council of Fashion Designers of America, Alfred A. Knopf, the Walt Disney Company, Mohawk Paper Mills, MillerCoors, the Toy Industry Association, Princeton University, Yale School of Architecture, New York University, the Fashion Institute of Technology, the Brooklyn Academy of Music, the Museum of Sex, and the New York Jets. Michael Bierut has done projects like I Want To Take You Higher, an exhibition on the psychedelic era for the Rock and Roll Hall of Fame, and has served as a design consultant to United Airlines. In 2006, he developed a new signage and identity for the expanded Morgan Library Museum. He has also developed the environmental graphics for the New York Times building, designed for Phillip Johnson's Glass House, and redesigned the magazine The Atlantic. Along with that, he has created marketing strategies for William Jefferson Clinton Foundation and developed a new brand strategy and packaging for Saks Fifth Avenue.

Prior to the 2016 Presidential election, he worked with Pentagram designer Jesse Reed to create the logo for Hillary Clinton's campaign, emphasizing its simplicity and boldness to make it memorable. Upon the release of the design, many designers, journalists, and constituents were critical of it but as the campaign released its customizable aspects it was better received, like after the landmark LGBT civil rights case Obergefell v. Hodges it was swathed in rainbow colors. He later recommended former student Jennifer Kinon as the campaign's design director.

Bierut and his team at Pentagram collaborated with Tod Williams Billie Tsien Architects to create a typographic architectural installation at the Barack Obama Presidential Center in Chicago. Entitled You Are America, the artwork, wrapping two sides of the building, renders an excerpt from Obama's 2015 Selma speech in five-foot-tall concrete letters made using a customized version of Gotham, Obama’s presidential campaign font.

In early 2025, after 35 years at Pentagram, Bierut reduced his role at the company to part-time consulting partner and advisor. In an interview with Creative Factor he stated that he no longer leads a design team or runs his own projects, only providing assistance and guidance to other Pentagram partners.

=== Design commentary ===
In 1993, he became a lecturer in graphic design at the Yale School of Art and was later appointed senior critic. In 2016, he joined the Yale School of Management to integrate design thinking into the program.

In 2003, Bierut co-founded Design Observer with Jessica Helfand, Rick Poynor, and William Drenttel, an online publication featuring news, features, and essays on design, urbanism, innovation and pop culture. His influence extends beyond design circles and his commentary can be found on public radio, appearing on “Studio 360” with Kurt Andersen. Dwell also works with him for design book recommendations and Fast Company asks for his opinions on corporate branding, and he writes articles on design for the New York Times.

Bierut also has a long-running history with Design Indaba where he spoke at 2005, 2010 and 2015 conference.

== Awards and achievements ==
Bierut's work is held in permanent collections at the Museum of Modern Art (MoMA), the Cooper Hewitt, Smithsonian Design Museum, and the Metropolitan Museum of Art in New York; the Library of Congress in Washington, DC; the San Francisco Museum of Modern Art (SFMOMA); Musée des Arts Decoratifs, Montreal, Canada; the Denver Art Museum; the Museum für Kunst und Gewerbe Hamburg, Germany; and the Museum of Design, Zürich, Switzerland.

From 1988 to 1990, Michael Bierut served as president of the New York Chapter of the American Institute of Graphic Arts (AIGA) and was president of AIGA National from 1998 to 2001. He is presently serving as vice president of the Architectural League of New York and previously served on the board of New Yorkers for Parks.

Bierut in 1989 was elected to the Alliance Graphique Internationale, and in 2003, he was named to the Art Directors Club Hall of Fame. He received highest honor in the profession in 2006, the AIGA Medal, which recognized his illustrious achievements and contributions to the field. In 2008, he received the Design Mind Award that was presented by the Cooper-Hewitt, National Design Museum, Smithsonian Institution. In 2015, he was awarded Masters Series Award by the School of Visual Arts and received his first comprehensive retrospective of his work.

== Books ==
- Seventy-Nine Short Essays on Design (2007, Princeton Architectural Press; ISBN 978-1568986999)
- How to Use Graphic Design to Sell Things, Explain Things, Make Things Look Better, Make People Laugh, Make People Cry, and (Every Once in a While) Change the World (2015, Harper Design; ISBN 978-0062413901)
- Now You See It and Other Essays on Design (2017, Princeton Architectural Press; ISBN 978-1616896249)
- Culture Is Not Always Popular: Fifteen Years of Design Observer (co-edited with Jessica Helfand, 2019, The MIT Press; ISBN 978-0262039109)
- How to Revised and Expanded Edition (2021, Harper; ISBN 978-0063141575)

== Personal life ==
Bierut resides in Tarrytown, New York.

== See also ==
- List of AIGA medalists
- Art Directors Club Hall of Fame
