= Julie Lasky =

American journalist, editor and critic

Julie Lasky is an American journalist, editor and critic best known for her writings on design and popular culture. From 2012 to 2015, she was the deputy editor of The New York Times' weekly "Home and Garden" section, for which she wrote a monthly column on new design called "The Details." Prior to that, she was editor of Change Observer, a Rockefeller Foundation-funded channel of the website Design Observer that focused on design and social innovation. From 2002 to 2009, she was editor-in-chief of I.D., the magazine of international product design. From 1998 to 2001, she edited Interiors magazine. She began her journalism career at Print, the graphic arts bimonthly.

== Publications ==
- Steve Heller and Julie Lasky, Borrowed Design: Use and Abuse of Historical Form, Wiley, 1993. ISBN 978-0471284406
- Julie Lasky, Some People Can't Surf: The Graphic Design of Art Chantry, Chronicle Books, 2001. ISBN 978-0811823654.
