= Communicate: Independent British Graphic Design since the Sixties =

An exhibition curated by Rick Poynor at the Barbican Art Gallery (2004) charting over 40 years of graphic design in the United Kingdom.

The first major attempt to reflect on how smaller independent studios and agencies marked and shaped the way images in everyday lives are perceived: from book and magazines, music covers and promotions, web design, corporate identities, politics and society and self-initiated projects.

The exhibition assembled some of the most iconic pieces produced since the early sixties. From the covers for Penguin Books by Derek Birdsall and Romek Marber, the magazines The Face by Neville Brody and i-D by Terry Jones, the memorable Never Mind the Bollocks – Here‘s the Sex Pistols, the Channel4 and BBC2 TV idents by Martin Lambie-Nairn, the graphic work for Pirelli by Fletcher/Forbes/Gill.

Other designers and studios included: Lucienne Roberts, Malcolm Garrett, Kate Hepburn, Peter Saville, Vaughan Oliver, Mark Farrow, Tomato, Intro, 8vo, Richard Hollis, Herbert Spencer, Ken Garland, Margaret Calvert, Jonathan Barnbrook, Why Not Associates, Trickett & Webb, Graphic Thought Facility, Jannuzzi Smith, Fuel, Kerr/Noble, Alan Kitching, The Designers Republic, Hi-Res, Paul Elliman, Nick Bell, Phil Baines and many others.

== Exhibition venues ==
- Museum für Gestaltung, Switzerland 18 Mar - 7 May 06
- Guangzhou Museum of Art, China 29 Apr - 15 May 05
- Shanghai Urban Planning Exhibition Centre, China 2–19 June 05
- Chongqing Three Gorges Museum, China 29 Jul - 14 Aug 05
- Millennium Monument- Beijing, China 16 Sept - 9 Oct 05
- Barbican Art Gallery, London, UK 16 Sept 04 - 23 Jan 05

== Sources ==
- Communicate: Independent British Graphic Design since the Sixties, Laurence King Publishing, 2004 (ISBN 978-1-85669-422-3)
- https://www.barbican.org.uk/artgallery/event-detail.asp?ID=3729 (Barbican Art Gallery)
- http://www.barbican.org.uk/artgallery/event-detail.asp?id=3729&pg=108 (Barbican Art Gallery)
- http://design.weblogsinc.com/2004/09/21/barbican-exhibit-celebrates-40-years-of-independent-british/ (DesignWebLog)
- https://web.archive.org/web/20101013121213/http://www.museum-gestaltung.ch/Htmls/Ausstellungen/Archiv/2006/communicate/communicate_d.html (Museum für Gestaltung)
- https://web.archive.org/web/20090116001749/http://www.britishcouncil.org/arts-add-design-graphic-design-communicate.htm (British Council)
- http://www.eyemagazine.com/review.php?id=117&rid=555 (Eye Magazine, Issue 55)
- https://www.theguardian.com/books/2004/aug/28/art (The Guardian)
