= Jennifer Kinon =

American graphic designer

Jennifer Kinon is an American graphic designer. She is a partner and co-founder of Champions Design, a design studio in New York City.

== Biography ==
Kinon attended the University of Michigan where she received a dual degree in graphic design and English. After undergrad, she enrolled in the masters program Design/Designer as Author + Entrepreneur at the School of Visual Arts (SVA), studying under Steven Heller. After graduation, she worked for Graphis Magazine, New York City's Olympic bid, and Pentagram under partner Michael Bierut. She was the first graduate of SVA's program to join as faculty.

In 2010, Kinon founded the New York-based design firm Original Champions of Design (OCD) with partner Bobby C. Martin Jr., whom she had met at SVA. The company was renamed Champions Design in 2020. At Champions, she has spearheaded the redesign of the magazine Ad Age, the Girl Scouts rebrand, and the WNBA rebrand. From 2010 to 2012 she served as President of AIGA NY and she was an Emeritus Board member from 2019 to 2021.

In July 2015, Kinon took a leave of absence from Champions to become the design director of Hillary Clinton's campaign for presidency. Kinon put together a team of designers to create a visual design system, which was unusual for campaign design utilizing the logo designed by Michael Bierut. She also incorporated elements of grassroots design, including the slogan #ImWithHer.
