= Green tree frog =

Green tree frog is a common name for several different tree frog species:

- American green tree frog (Hyla cinerea), a frog in the family Hylidae found in the southern United States
- Australian green tree frog (Litoria caerulea), a frog in the family Hylidae native to Australia and New Guinea
- Emerald green tree frog (Rhacophorus prasinatus), a frog in the family Rhaco to northern Taiwan

== See also ==
- GTF (disambiguation)
