= Tom Vanderbilt =

American journalist

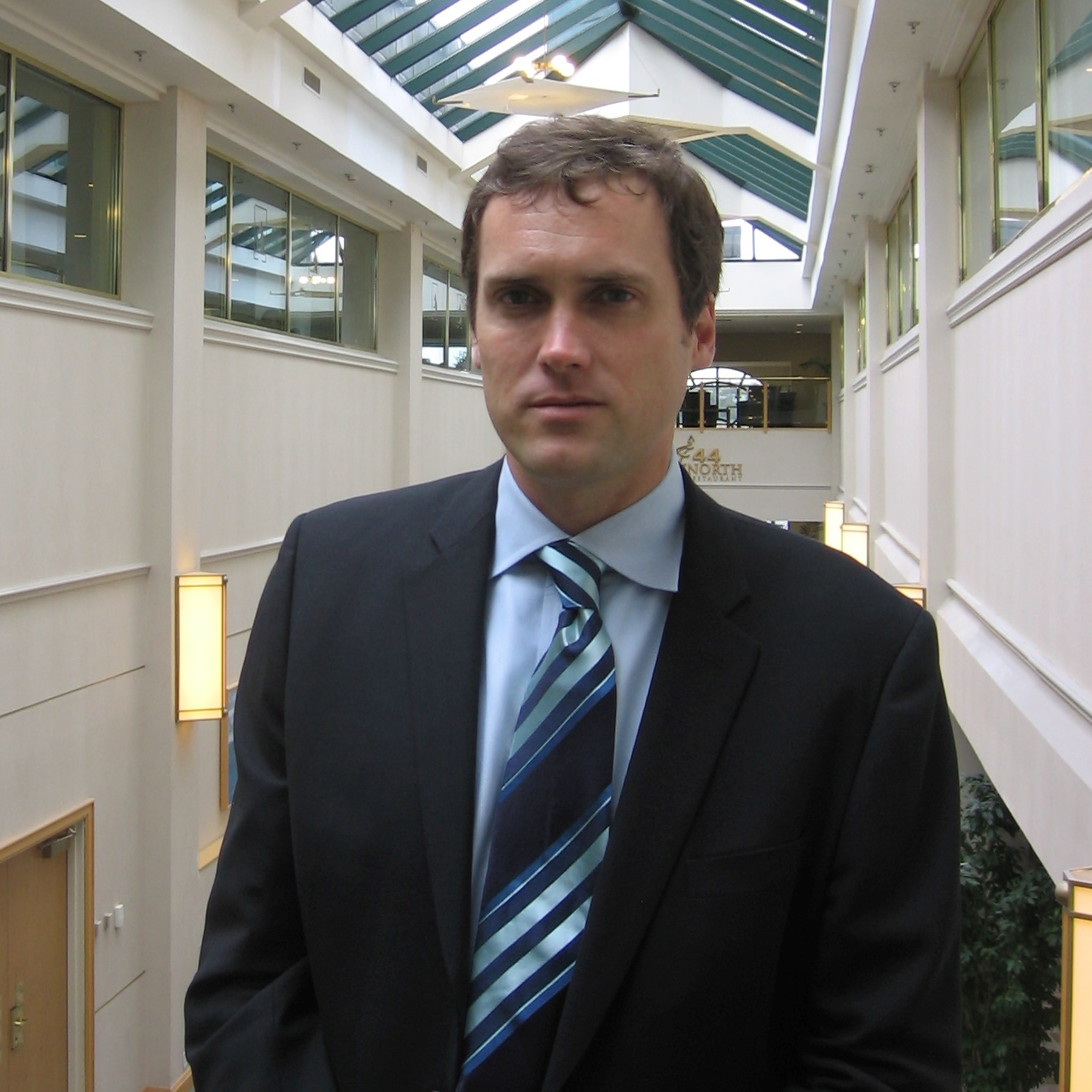
- Vanderbilt in 2008
- Born: 1968 (age 57–58); Oak Forest, Illinois, U.S.
- Education: University of Wisconsin-Madison (BA)
- Occupations: Journalist, blogger, author
- Notable work: Traffic: Why We Drive the Way We Do (and What It Says About Us)
- Spouse: Jancee Dunn

Tom Vanderbilt (born 1968) is an American journalist, blogger, and author of the best-selling book, Traffic: Why We Drive the Way We Do (and What It Says About Us).

== Career ==
A freelancer, Vanderbilt has contributed articles on a broad range of subjects encompassing design, technology, science, and culture to such publications as Slate, Wired, The London Review of Books, Artforum, The Financial Times, Rolling Stone, New York Times Magazine, Harvard Design Magazine, Cabinet, Metropolis, Design Observer, The Wilson Quarterly, and Popular Science.

In 2002, he published his first full-length book, Survival City: Adventures Among the Ruins of Atomic America. H-Net Reviews said of the book, "Survival City offers an insightful exploration of the ruins of atomic America that demands attention in our current moment. In the poignant aftermath of September 11 the futility of Cold War architecture suggested throughout the book takes on new resonance."

After three years of research, in 2008 he released Traffic which, according to the publisher Knopf's promotional material, had a first run printing of 150,000 copies and was a feature of the Book of the Month Club. The Wall Street Journal called Traffic, “a fascinating survey of the oddities and etiquette of driving”. The Boston Globe wrote of the book's genesis: "He found no serious general books about [driving] but did find a mountain of research. So for three years he immersed himself in the subject, traveled around the world, interviewing drivers, researchers, and traffic engineers. With almost 90 pages of footnotes, the book is a bottomless compendium of research." Some of this research began by asking a question on the community weblog Metafilter in 2005. While Vanderbilt found the responses useful, mentioning the site during a Boing Boing ingenuity lecture; he referred to the site's users as "overeducated and over-opinionated geeks." His publisher, Knopf, neglected to request the right to reprint comments from the site from Metafilter's staff or from the quoted users.

He is a contributing editor to I.D. and Print, and a contributing writer for the blog Design Observer. He is also a visiting scholar at New York University's Rudin Center for Transportation Policy and Management.

== Personal life ==
Tom Vanderbilt was born in Oak Forest, Illinois and raised in Wisconsin. He is a graduate of the University of Wisconsin-Madison. He now resides in Brooklyn, New York. He is married to Jancee Dunn, a former features writer for Rolling Stone.

Vanderbilt was a contestant on the game show Jeopardy!, appearing on an episode which aired on December 30, 2011.

== Publications ==
=== As author ===
- The Sneaker Book: Anatomy of an Industry and an Icon, The New Press, 1998
- Survival City: Adventures Among the Ruins of Atomic America, Princeton Architectural Press, 2002
- Traffic: Why We Drive the Way We Do (and What It Says About Us), Knopf, 2008
- You May Also Like: Taste in an Age of Endless Choice, Penguin Random House, May 2016
- Beginners: The Curious Power of Lifelong Learning, Knopf, 2021

=== As contributor ===
He has also contributed to a number of books, including:

- Season’s Gleamings: The Art of the Aluminum Christmas Tree, Melcher Media, 2004 (afterword)
- Supercade: A Visual History of the Videogame Age, The MIT Press,
- Commodify Your Dissent: Salvos from the Baffler, W.W. Norton,
- Boob Jubilee: The Mad Cultural Politics of the New Economy (W.W. Norton), and
- The World and the Wild (University of Arizona Press).
