= Streetcar Stop for Portland =

Sculpture in Portland, Oregon

- The sculpture in August 2015
- Artist: Jorge Pardo
- Year: 2013
- Type: Sculpture
- Medium: Fiberglass; steel
- Location: Portland, Oregon, United States; 45.53448°N 122.6694°W

Streetcar Stop for Portland is an outdoor 2013 sculpture by Cuban American artist Jorge Pardo, located at the intersection of North Broadway and North Wiedler Street in Portland, Oregon's Lloyd District, in the United States. The fiberglass and steel structure measures 15' 9" x 33' 10" x 17' 3". According to the Regional Arts & Culture Council, which administers the work, Pardo intended it to be "best when it is dark and rainy and the interior lighting creates a warm glow that stands out like a beacon amongst its dark surroundings".

== See also ==
- 2013 in art
