= Graphic Thought Facility =

Graphic Thought Facility (also known as GTF) is a London-based graphic design agency.

== History ==
The studio was founded in 1990 by Royal College of Art graduates Paul Neale, Nigel Robinson and Andy Stevens. Nigel left the practice in 1993 to pursue a solo career and was later replaced by Huw Morgan.

Since its inception, the company has produced work for a range of clients such as the stores Habitat, the Science Museum, the Tate, the One the Little Indian Records and the influential art magazine Frieze.

Graphic Thought Facility has been shown in numerous exhibition including GTF: 50 Projects (DDD, Osaka, 2006), The/Le Garage (with Paul Elliman, 15 éme Festival International de l’affiche et des arts graphiques, Chaumont, 2004) and Communicate: Independent British Graphic Design since the Sixties (Barbican Art Gallery, London 2004).
