= Jannuzzi Smith =

- Industry: Design
- Founded: 1993
- Headquarters: London, England, UK
- Key people: Michele Jannuzzi, Paolo Jannuzzi and Richard Smith (Directors)
- Website: www.jannuzzismith.com

Jannuzzi Smith is a design studio founded in 1993 by Michele Jannuzzi (1967) and Richard Smith (1967) in London. They now have offices in London and Lugano, Switzerland.

Included among their projects are the print/online marketing programme for Central Saint Martins College of Art and Design (2002–2006); Informal by Cecil Balmond (2002); and the rebrand of Festival del film Locarno (2007–2010).

== History ==
Michele Jannuzzi (a graduate of CSIA Lugano) and Richard Smith (a graduate of Brighton University) met at the Royal College of Art where they obtained Master of Arts degree in 1992. From the very beginning their work has been influenced by technology (The Joseph H Hazen Collection – a CD-Rom for Sotheby's, 1994; Totemweb – a webzine on architecture and design, 1996). The studio gained its initial reputation thanks to a long lasting collaboration with Central Saint Martins College of Art and Design (1996-2008), followed by their partnership with structural engineer guru Cecil Balmond on the creation of the seminal book Informal.

Jannuzzi Smith are authors of Dotlinepixel – thoughts on cross-media design (2000), About (2006) and organisers of the exhibition The Naked Word at the Lethaby Gallery (London, 2003) and the conference Swiss Graphic Design at the Cochrane Theatre (London, 2006).

Their work has been featured in several publications and exhibitions, including: SwissPeaks, Totem Gallery, New York (2002); Something Totally Else, Design Museum, London (2003), Communicate: Independent British Graphic Design since the Sixties, Barbican Art Gallery, London (2004) and Museum of Design Zurich (2006).

== Gallery ==
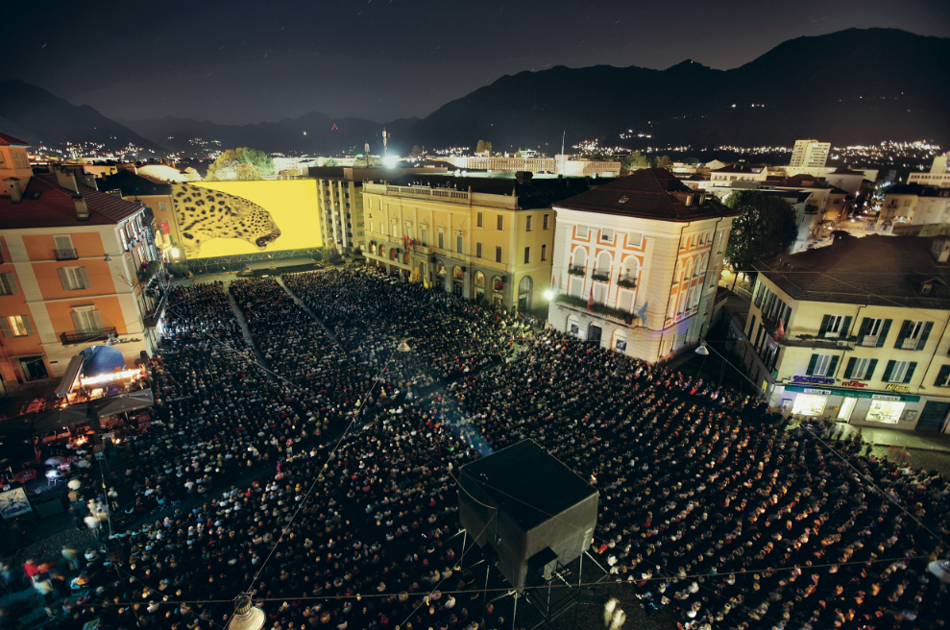
The logotype of the Locarno Film Festival screened in Piazza Grande
