= Mayo Clinic Center for Innovation =

American medical innovation group

The Mayo Clinic Center for Innovation (CFI), embedded within Mayo Clinic, is one of the United States's first and largest health care delivery innovation group working within a major academic medical center.

Based in the Mayo Clinic's main facility in Rochester, MN, the CFI has more than 50 full-time staff including service designers, project managers, information technology specialists, and clinicians working together to develop health care delivery solutions for Mayo's Clinic's 64,000 employees and half a million patients annually in Rochester as well at Mayo Clinic's branch facilities in Jacksonville, Florida, and Phoenix/Scottsdale, Arizona.

== History of the Center for Innovation ==
Formally established as the Mayo Clinic Center for Innovation in 2008, the 50+ member multidisciplinary team has grown to be one of the largest among an increasing number of health care innovation centers at U.S. academic and non-profit medical centers. A precursor to the Center for Innovation, the SPARC Lab, was created in the Department of Medicine with a staff of two. By 2008, the SPARC Lab had grown to 24 full-time staff and was rechristened as the Mayo Clinic Center for Innovation.

In its first three years, the CFI completed more than 100 innovation projects within the Mayo system, ranging from redesigning Mayo's traditional clinical exam room; to streamlining job descriptions and protocols in a dermatology clinic; to analyzing how hospital care teams hand off patients from one team to another; to supporting a project with a “stroke robot” that enables Mayo physicians to consult with patients from a remote location within seconds of the first possible signs of a stroke. The CFI's staff is built around a core of graduates from design schools and designers recruited from design firms and service-oriented companies.

== The Outpatient Lab ==
In its early years, the CFI (then the SPARC Lab) developed the Outpatient Lab, where consenting patients were observed in prototypes of newly designed examination rooms that were altered in size, shape and configuration. These Outpatient Lab studies resulted in a redesign of Mayo Clinic's basic examination room. In the old room, the exam table was placed in the center of the room, with doctor-patient conversations held at a desk adjacent to the exam table. In the new configuration, doctors and patients chat with each other at a round table in a carpeted room with the examination table, clothes-changing area and medical instruments located in an adjoining room.

== The Design Research Studio ==
At the CFI's Design Research Studio, designers and project managers collaborate with Mayo physicians, nurses and care team members to brainstorm and prototype solutions to health care delivery problems.

== Project management ==
In 2009, project managers were added to the CFI staff, partly in recognition that the creative aspect of design thinking requires a counterbalancing force to keep projects driving towards deadlines, cost and quality control, and defined scope of work.

== SPARC Innovation Program ==
The SPARC Innovation Program at the Mayo Clinic in Rochester, Minnesota, is widely recognized as the first design-based research and development laboratory for health services.

The brainchild of Drs. Nicholas F. LaRusso, Chair, Department of Medicine, and Michael D. Brennan, Associate Chair, Department of Medicine, the idea of SPARC began on a run. LaRusso and Brennan, both avid runners, imagined a space where new ideas might be thoroughly tested before implementation within the clinical practice. The two believed that its insular protection from the demands of the practice would improve the rate of innovation in health service delivery. This vision rapidly evolved when Ryan Armbruster was asked to lead the development of this capability. Consequently, they recruited Dr. Alan Kendall Duncan, Jennifer Dusso, Dr. Prathibha Varkey, and later Dr. Victor Montori to realize this vision, with designers (widely recognized as some of the first embedded designers working within a healthcare institution on healthcare experience & delivery): Maggie Breslin, Matt Maleska, Christine Janae - Leoniak, and J. Paul Neeley.

In 2002, the group engaged the design firm IDEO to help envision the concept of a physical laboratory for service innovation. What emerged from a lengthy design process was a concept that was realized through additional design talent of Steelcase. The central feature of the laboratory was the concept of a design studio embedded in a clinical practice, placing designers, business strategists, and medical professionals in close proximity to permit collaborations on a variety of projects.

The laboratory opened in June 2004. Its methodology, See-Plan-Act-Refine-Communicate, is a description of a design methodology that is rooted in the techniques of ethnography, prototyping, design thinking, and business integration. The laboratory was created through internal funds, philanthropic support, and a grant from the VHA Health Foundation. SPARC currently employs a staff of 10, including designers, business professionals, and health workers.

The research group functions as a design consultancy and has worked on multiple projects over the course of over two years. They created the first patient-use service kiosk at Mayo Clinic Rochester; as well as creating a vision for the physical design of the ambulatory practice of the future. SPARC has collaborated with a number of other groups, notably the Knowledge and Encounter Research Unit
