= William H. Helfand =

American collector and author

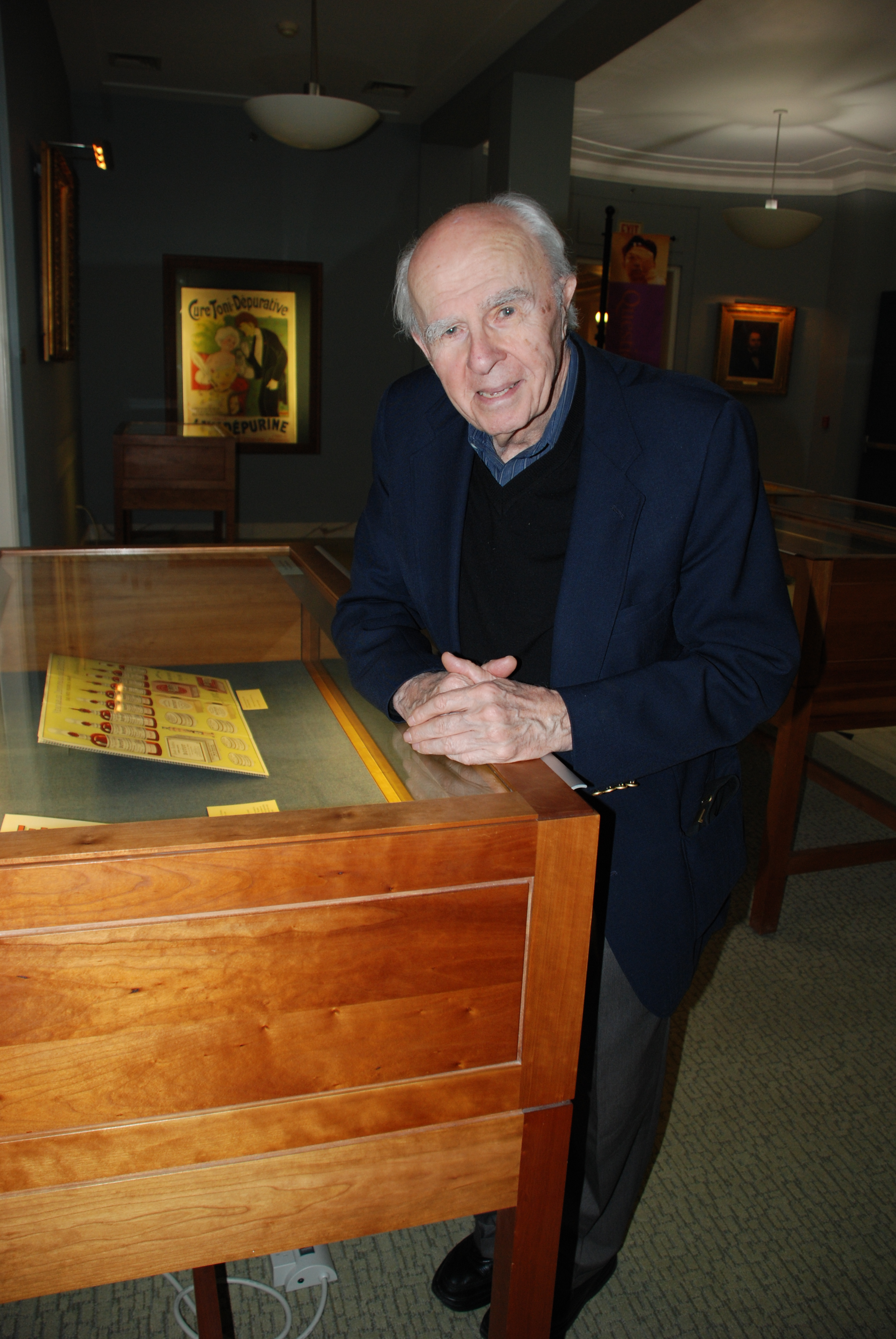
- Helfand at the Harvey Cushing/John Hay Whitney Medical Library in 2011
- Born: May 21, 1926; Philadelphia, Pennsylvania, U.S.
- Died: October 2, 2018 (aged 92)
- Education: Central High School; University of Pennsylvania; Philadelphia College of Pharmacy and Science
- Occupation: Writer
- Children: Jessica Helfand

William H. Helfand (May 21, 1926 – October 2, 2018) was an American collector, author, and authority on the history of medical ephemera and quackery. His many donations are held across numerous research institutions.

== Biography ==
William Hirsh Helfand was born on May 21, 1926, in Philadelphia, Pennsylvania. He graduated from Central High School in 1943. After two years in the army, in 1948 he earned a bachelor's degree in Chemical Engineering from the University of Pennsylvania, and in 1952 a degree in pharmacy from the Philadelphia College of Pharmacy and Science. He joined Merck, first in marketing division, spending over 33 years at the multinational pharmaceutical company. He was President of the French division from 1970 to 1974, and later a senior vice president of the international division when he retired in 1987.

While studying pharmacy, Helfand began collecting medical ephemera after taking a class in art at the Barnes Foundation in Philadelphia. He continued to collect for over fifty years, at home and while on trips abroad working for Merck. He amassed a collection that included prints, posters, bookplates, caricatures, broadsides, trade cards, sheet music, and printed ephemera.

Helfand published widely on the social history of prints, posters, and pharmaceutical ephemera. He was awarded the Kremers Award in 1972 and the Urdang Medal in 1989 from the American Institute of the History of Pharmacy. He was the recipient of the Pepys Medal from the Ephemera Society in London in 1986. He was awarded honorary doctorate degrees from the Philadelphia College of Pharmacy and Science and the Albany College of Pharmacy.

Helfand is the father of designer, author, and educator, Jessica Helfand.

== Selected publications ==
Helfand published numerous articles on the history of medicine and pharmacy. His published books include:

- Pharmacy: An Illustrated History (co-authored with David Cowen, 1990)
- The Picture of Health (1991)
- Quack, Quack, Quack: The Sellers of Nostrums in Prints, Posters, Ephemera, & Books (2002)

== External Resources ==
- William Helfand collection of medical ephemera, Medical Historical Library, Harvey Cushing/John Hay Whitney Medical Library, Yale University.
- William H. Helfand Collection, Online Archive of California.
- William H. Helfand Collection of Medical Prints and Posters, 1695-1991, bulk 1800-1899, Archives & Manuscripts, Duke University Library.
- William H. Helfand Collection of Pharmaceutical Trade Cards, The New York Academy of Medicine.
- William Helfand Phone Card Collection, Archives Center, National Museum of American History, Smithsonian Institution.
- William H. Helfand Popular Medicine Collection, The Library Company of Philadelphia.
