= Alex Coles (art critic) =

British art historian

Alex Coles is an author and academic drawn to the borders between disciplines and genres.

Coles' current writing is devoted to music. Exploring the archetype of the intimate ballad singer, Crooner was published by Reaktion Books in 2023. Developing an analysis of the twisted love song, Tainted Love: From Nina Simone to Kendrick Lamar (Sternberg Press, 2023) followed and was launched with a roundtable debate at the Whitechapel Gallery and featured on Chris Hawkins' BBC6 breakfast show. Tracing the role of jazz as a catalyst in popular music, Fusion! From Alice Coltrane to Moor Mother is published by Sternberg Press in October 2024.

Coles' earlier writing focussed on design and art. DesignArt (Tate Publishing, 2005) triggered a debate about the interface between the two disciplines, while the edited anthology Design and Art (MIT Press/Whitechapel Publications, 2007) contextualised responses to it. The Transdisciplinary Studio (Sternberg Press, 2012) and the EP series (Sternberg Press 2013-) followed. Reviews of these books appeared in The New York Times, Icon, The Journal of Design History and Design Journal.

Essays were commissioned for the following exhibition catalogues and monographs: Konstantin Grcic: Champions (Flammarion, 2011); Ronan & Erwan Bouroullec: Bivouac (Centre Pompidou-Metz, 2012); Olafur Eliasson: Unspoken Spaces (Thames & Hudson, 2016); and Objects of Desire: Surrealism and Design (Vitra Design Museum, 2019).

Keynote lectures were presented at the conferences: Transforming Place, Tate Modern, 2013, In Need Of, Design Academy, Eindhoven, 2016, Design & Crafts in Dialogue, Nova Iskra, Belgrade, and Learning and Teaching, The University of the Arts, London, 2018.

== Academic posts ==
Coles is currently visiting professor at the University of Falmouth. Between 2011 and 2023 Coles was Professor in the School of Arts & Humanities at the University of Huddersfield.
